= Women's Ordination Conference =

Organisation supporting female ordination in the Catholic Church

The Women's Ordination Conference is an organization in the United States that works to ordain women as deacons, priests, and bishops in the Catholic Church.

Founded in 1975, the conference was seeded from an idea the year before, when Mary B. Lynch asked the people on her Christmas list if it was time to publicly ask "Should Catholic women be priests?" 31 women and one man answered yes, and thus a task force was formed and a national meeting was planned. The first gathering was held in Detroit, Michigan on the Thanksgiving weekend of 1975, with nearly 2,000 people in attendance. Ruth Fitzpatrick was hired as the conference's national coordinator in 1977 and served in that role from 1977-78 and then returned to that role for a decade starting in 1985.

== History ==
After its foundation in 1975, WOC became more prominent in 1979 during Pope John Paul II's first visit to the United States. Three leaders of the group, including Ruth Fitzpatrick, led an all-night candlelight vigil outside the place where the Pope was staying the night before the pope's audience at the Basilica of the National Shrine of the Immaculate Conception in Washington, D.C. During the pope's talk at the venue, Mercy Sr. Theresa Kane, then the leader of the Leadership Conference of Women Religious, asked the pope to permit women to serve in all ministries of the Catholic Church.

The organization has also hosted several conferences after their inaugural event in 1975 in Detroit, with conferences in 1978 in Baltimore and 1995 in Washington, D.C. It has also hosted conferences in conjunction with Women's Ordination Worldwide in 2001 in Dublin, Ireland, and 2005 in Ottawa, Canada. Those two groups also hosted a conference in September 2015 in Philadelphia, just prior to Pope Francis' first visit to the United States.

In October 2018, WOC organized a peaceful protest outside the Congregation for the Doctrine of the Faith in Rome to call for "Votes for Catholic Women" during the Fifteenth Ordinary General Assembly of the Synod of Bishops on "Young People, Faith, and Vocational Discernment." The "Votes for Catholic Women" campaign gained both liberal and conservative support in arguing that female religious superiors should be allowed to vote alongside male religious superiors at the Synod. Members of WOC and other Catholic reform groups clashed with Italian police during the protest.

== Leadership and views ==
Kate McElwee is the executive director of the Women's Ordination Conference as of June 2022.

WOC leaders frequently cite a conclusion of Catholic theologians from the Vatican's Pontifical Biblical Commission that found no scriptural basis for the exclusion of women from the Catholic priesthood. The conference has said Pope Francis could refer to that finding to allow females into the priesthood.

He [Francis] could have quoted the Vatican's own the Pontifical Biblical Commission that concluded in 1976 that there is no valid scriptural or theological reason for denying ordination to women.

—

WOC draws upon a range of scriptural, historical, theological, and political material to promote women's ordination. These positions include Jesus's inclusion of women as his partners in ministry, evidence for women's leadership in the early church, the theological stance that women are capable of imaging Christ on earth, the church's evolution throughout history, the authenticity of women's vocations, and the sociopolitical outcomes of women's equal leadership.

== Canonical status ==
As with another organization dedicated to the ordination of women in the Catholic Church, Roman Catholic Womenpriests, members of WOC that have attempted female Catholic ordination enter into state of automatic (latae sententiae) excommunication.

== See also ==
- Ordination of women and the Catholic Church
- Women in the Catholic Church
- Roman Catholic Womenpriests
- Leadership Conference of Women Religious A leadership group of U.S. Catholic sisters that in the past has publicly raised the question of opening all Catholic ministries to women
- Catholics for Choice An organization which rejects official Church teaching regarding abortion, contraception, and sexual ethics.
- Call to Action An American organization that advocates for a variety of changes in the Catholic Church.
