= Women's Ordination Worldwide =

Women's Ordination Worldwide (WOW) is an ecumenical network of groups whose primary mission is to allow Roman Catholic women admission to all ordained ministries. The WOW network includes organizations from Australia, Bangladesh, Canada, France, Germany, Great Britain, Ireland, Japan, Malta, Poland, Western Europe, and the United States.

== Leadership and views ==
WOW is led by a Steering Committee of representatives from all member groups. It draws on scriptural and theological sources to argue for the participation of women in the Catholic priesthood.

== History ==
WOW was founded in 1996 in Austria during the First European Women's Synod. In 2001, Ireland's Brothers and Sisters in Christ (now merged with We Are Church Ireland) organized WOW's first international conference in Dublin. WOW's second international conference was held in Ottawa, Canada in July 2005. Speakers at the Ottawa conference included Elisabeth Schussler Fiorenza and Rosemary Radford Ruether. The third was sponsored by the U.S.-based Women's Ordination Conference in Philadelphia, PA in September 2015. The 2015 conference took place ahead of the first visit by Pope Francis to the U.S.

== Controversy ==
Catholic priests have been sanctioned for their involvement with WOW. Two days after appearing at the Philadelphia conference, Precious Blood Fr. Jack McClure was told that he could no longer celebrate Mass at Most Holy Redeemer parish in San Francisco. Roy Bourgeois, founder of SOA Watch, was dismissed from the Maryknoll Fathers and Brothers for his support of women's ordination and has participated in WOW actions.

== See also ==
- Ordination of women and the Catholic Church
- Women in the Catholic Church
- Roman Catholic Womenpriests
- Women's Ordination Conference
- Leadership Conference of Women Religious
