= Ruth Fitzpatrick =

American activist (1933–2023)

Ruth Louise Fitzpatrick (née McDonough; March 10, 1933 – June 15, 2023) was a leader in the Women’s Ordination Conference, a group which has advocated for the ordination of women as priests in the Catholic Church. She became the conference's national coordinator in 1977 and served in that role from 1977 to 1978 and then returned to that role for a decade starting in 1985.
