= Women in the Catholic Church =

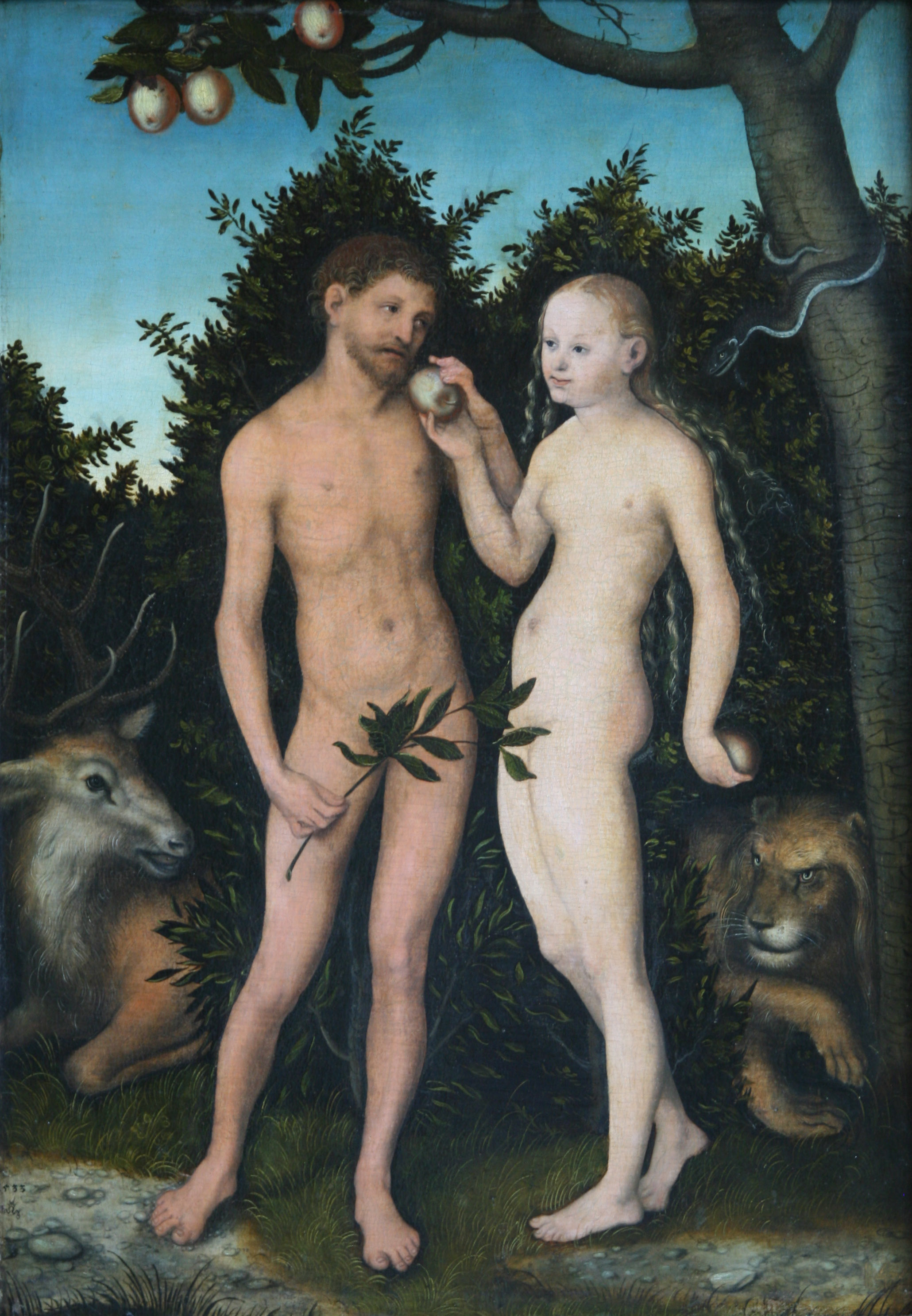
Adam and Eve

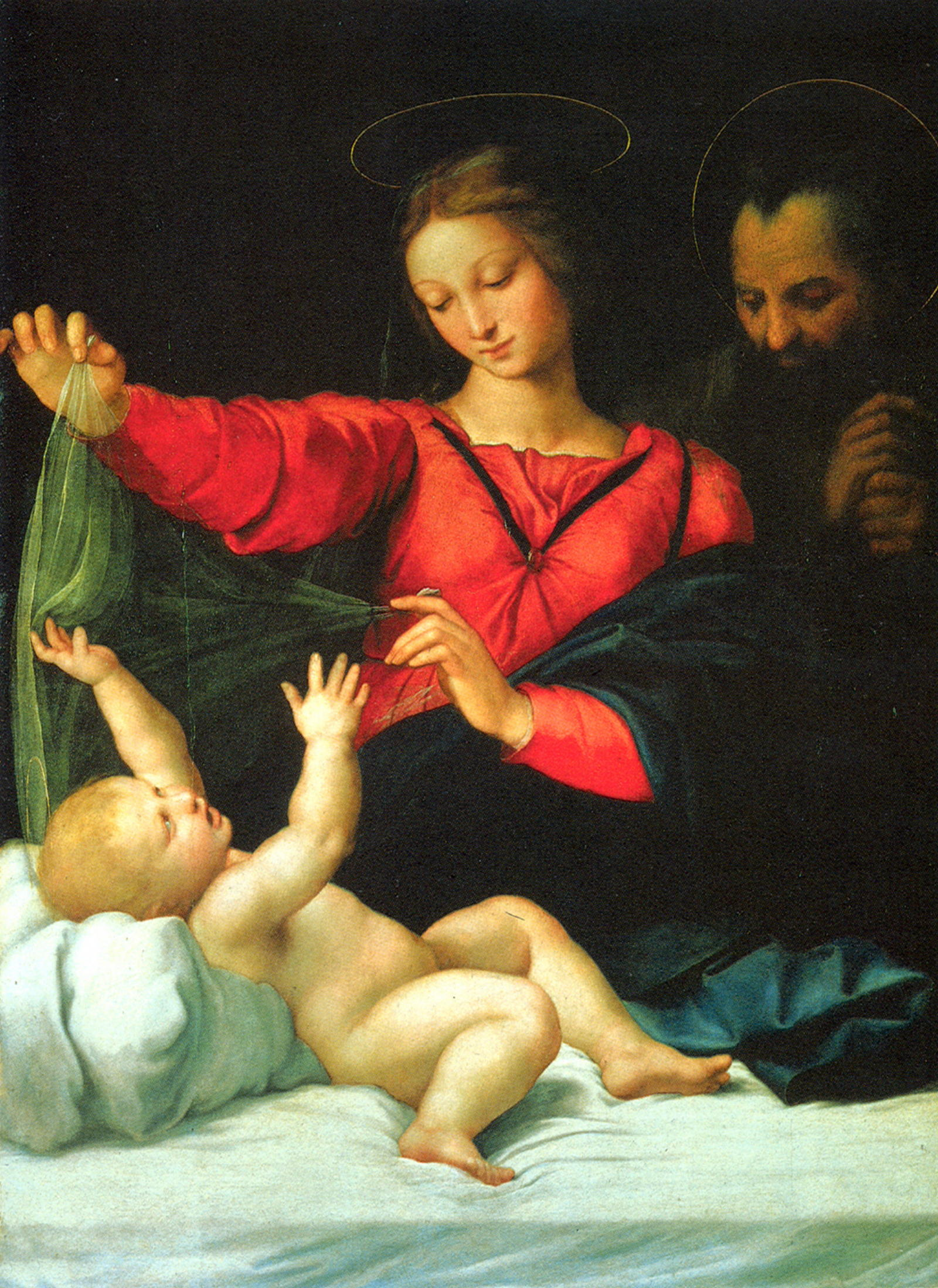
Madonna and Christ Child

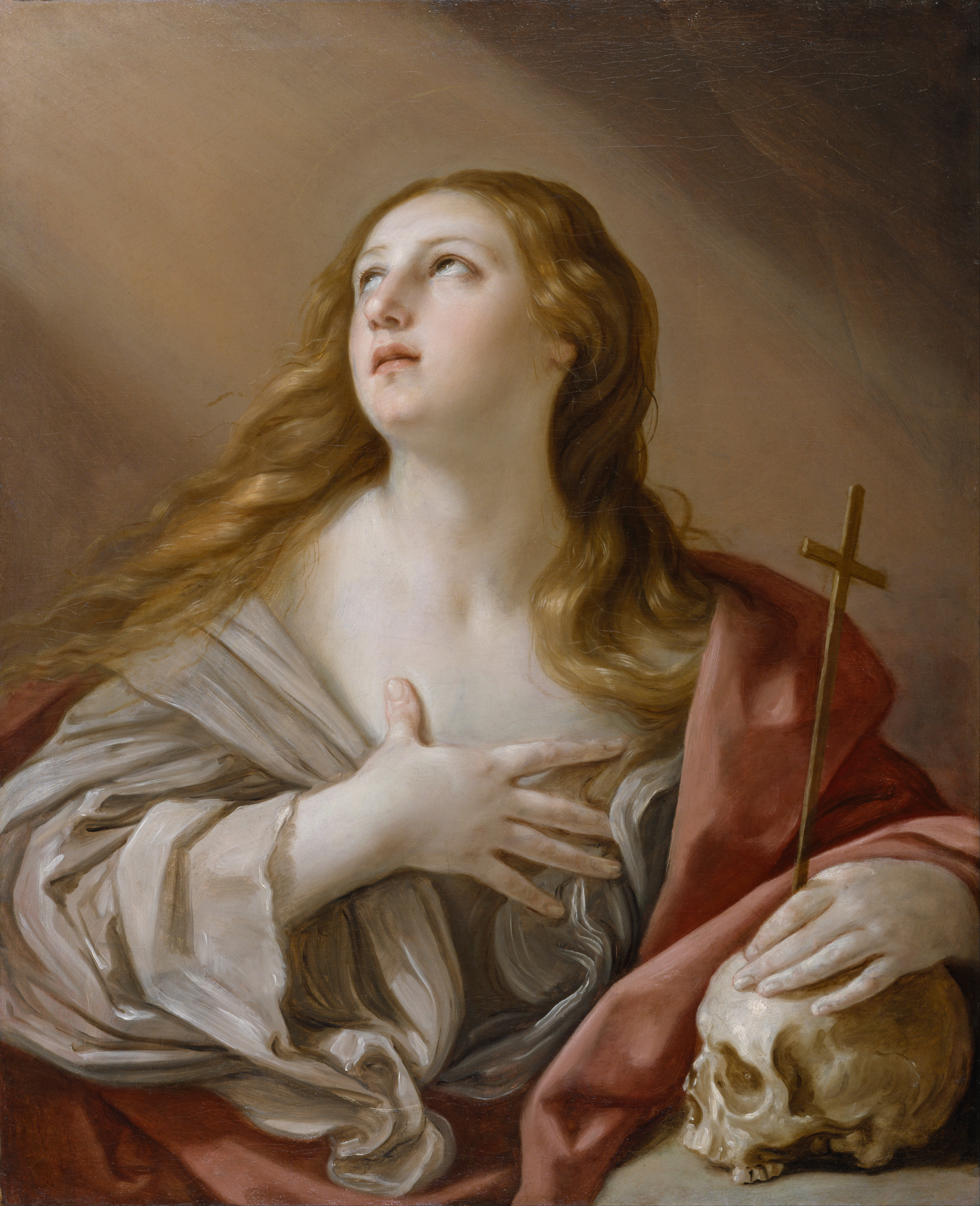
Penitent Magdalene

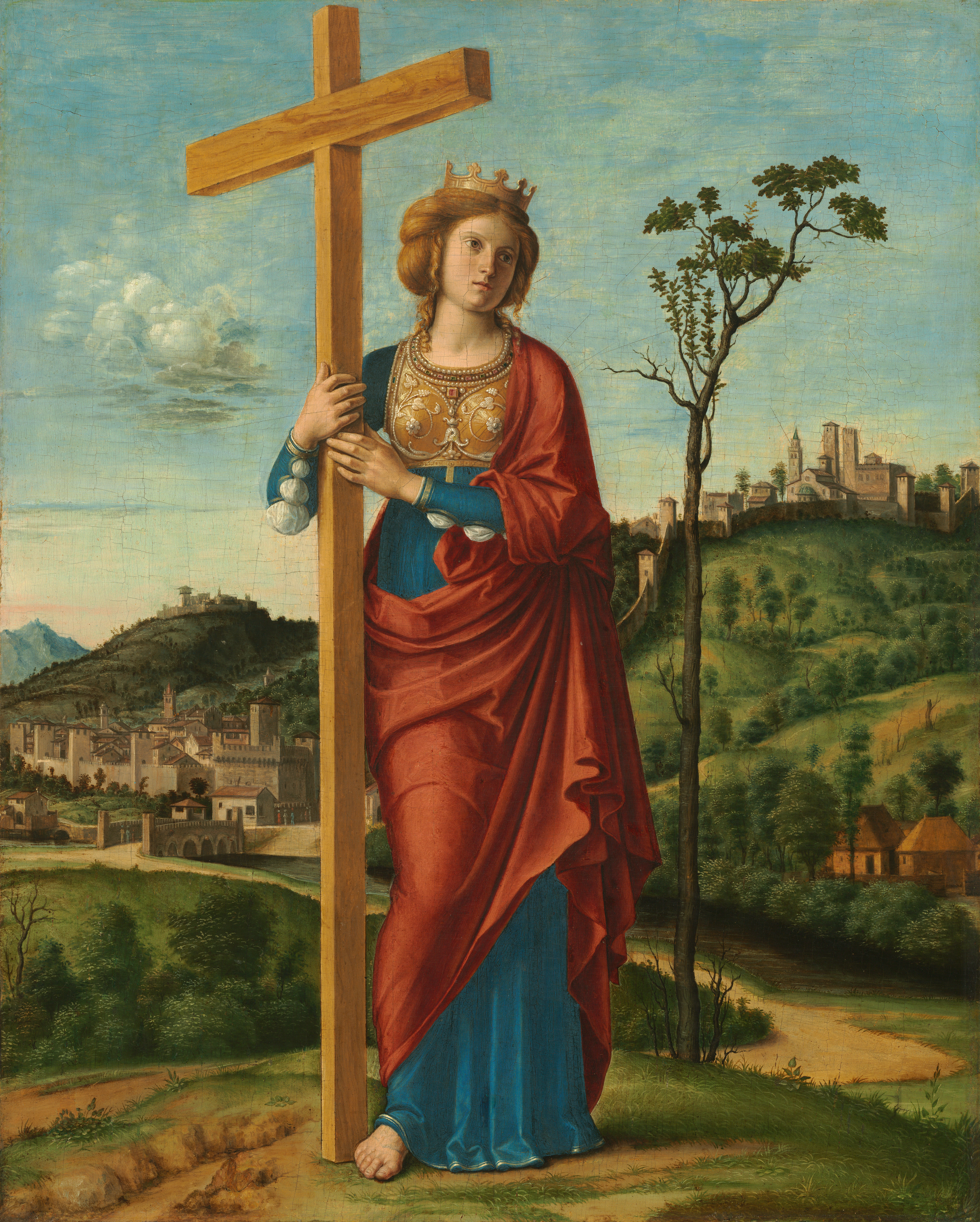
St. Helena

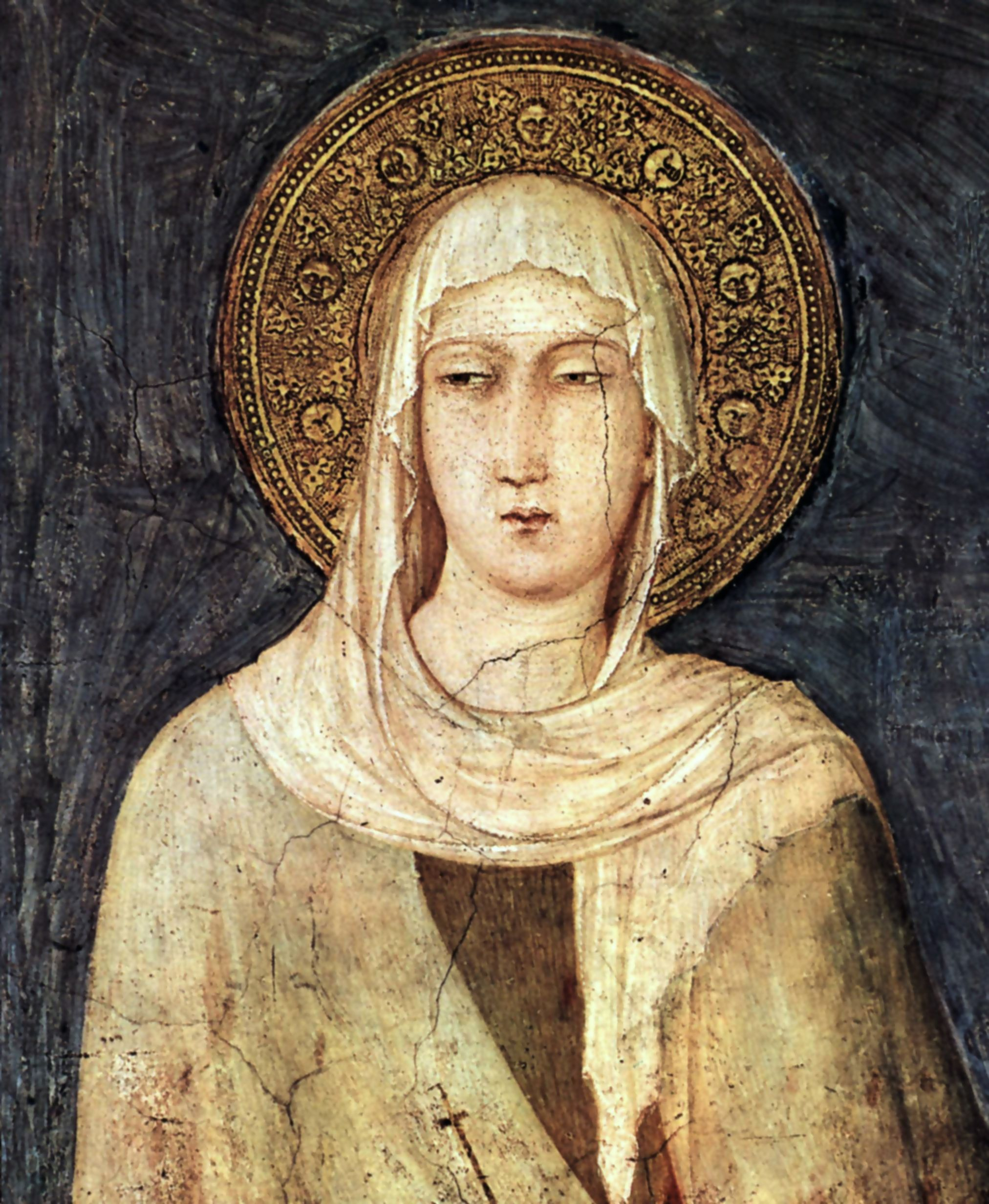
St. Clare of Assisi

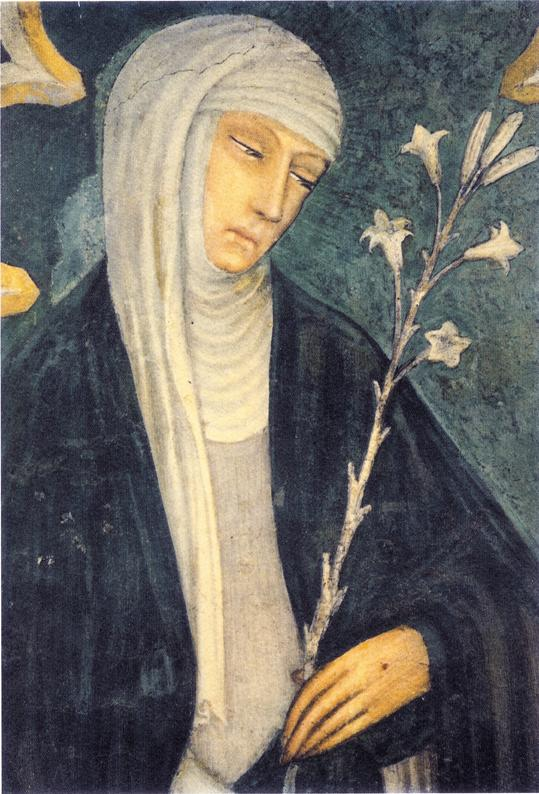
St. Catherine of Sienna

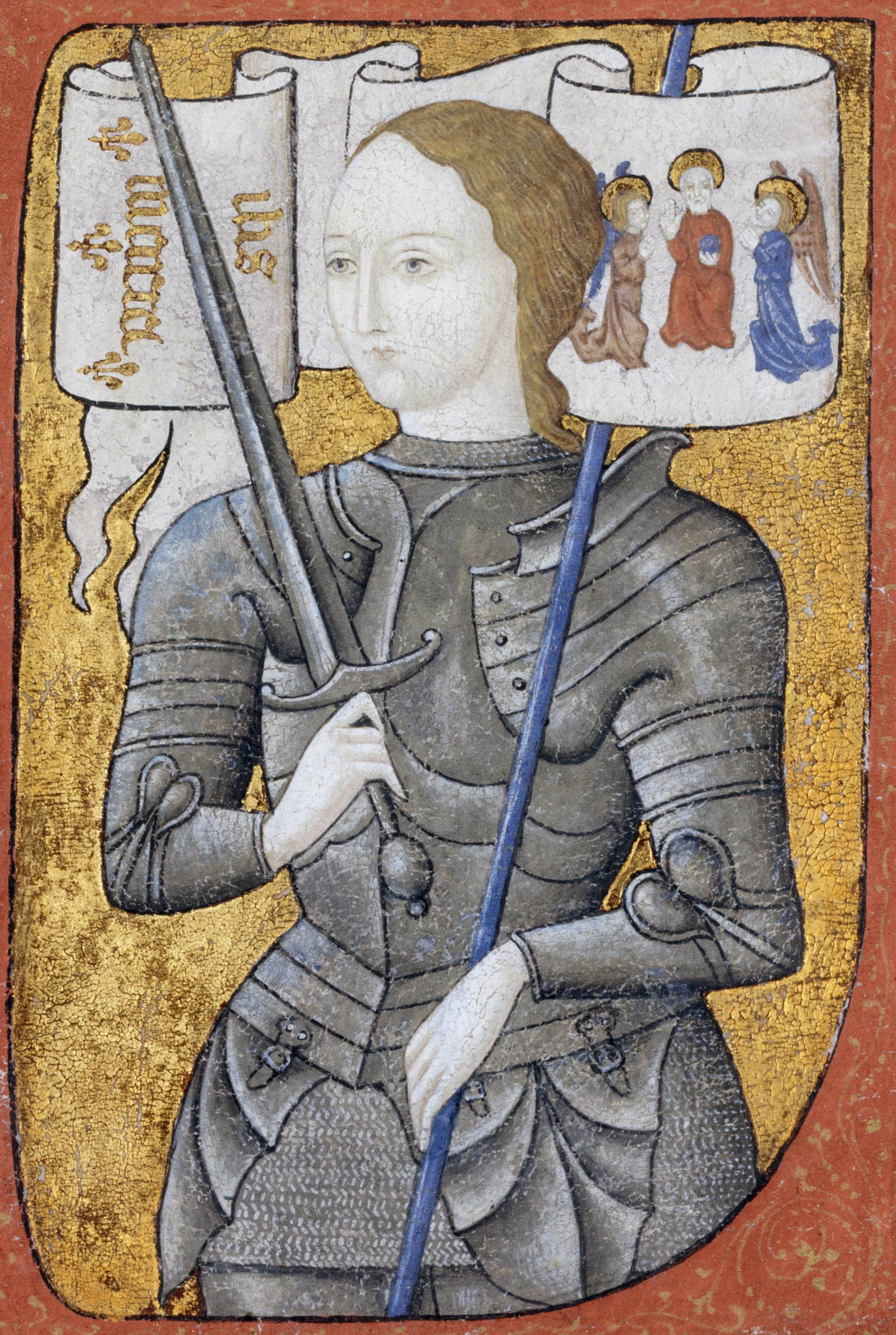
Joan of Arc

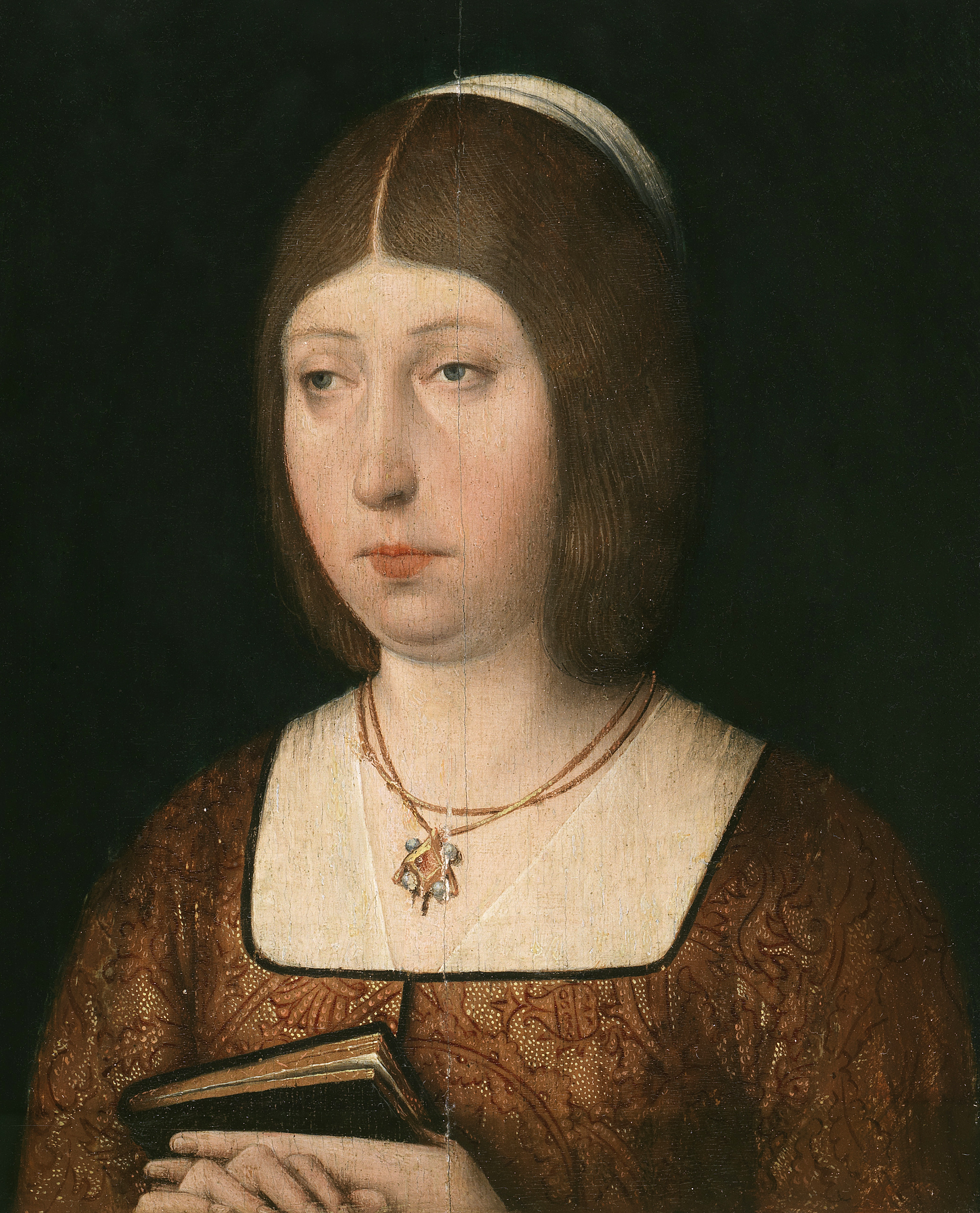
Isabella I of Castile

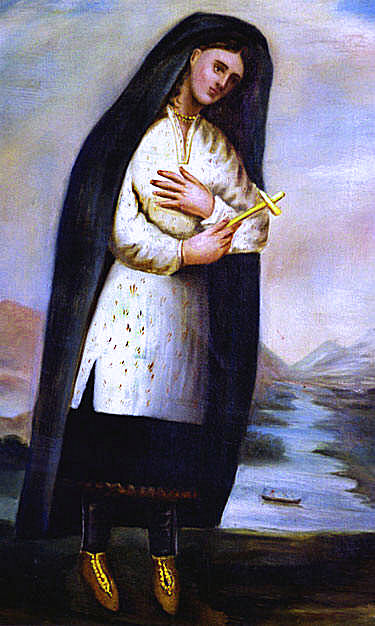
Saint Kateri Tekakwitha

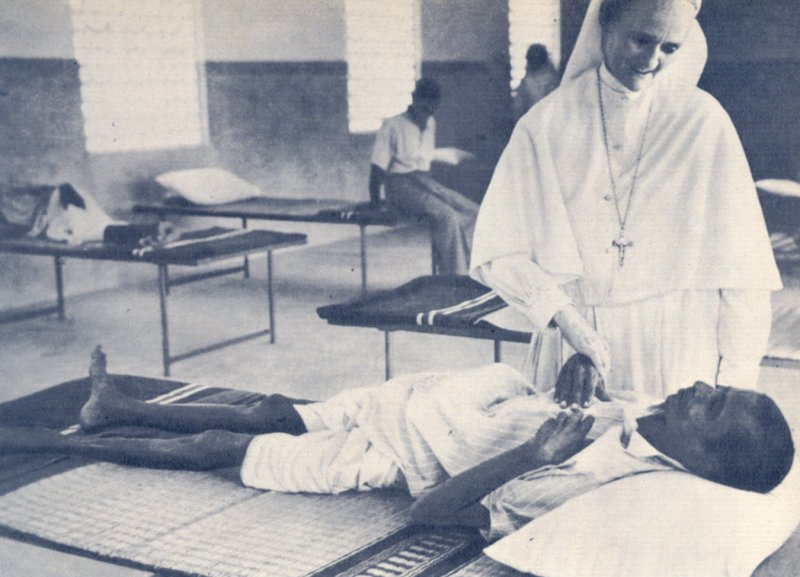
Salesian Sister

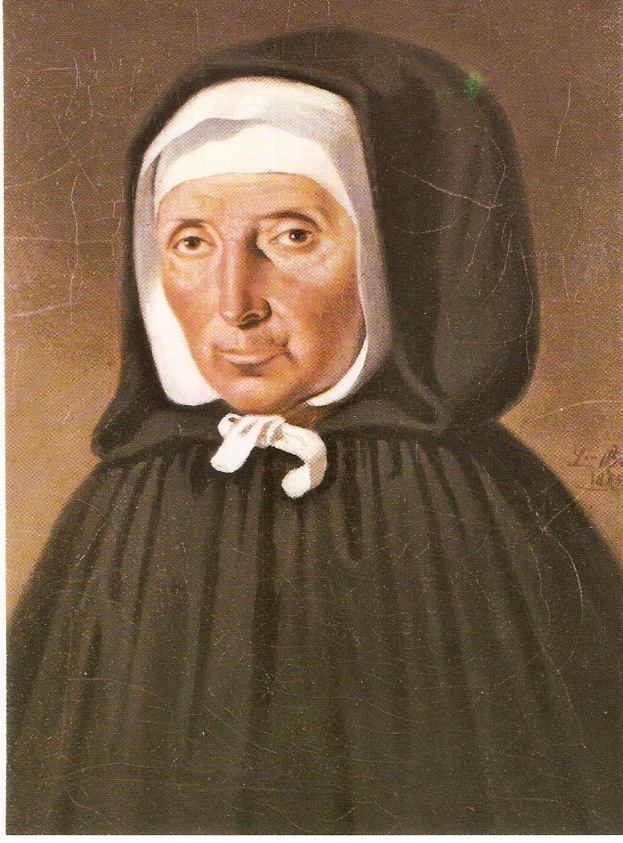
St. Jeanne Jugan

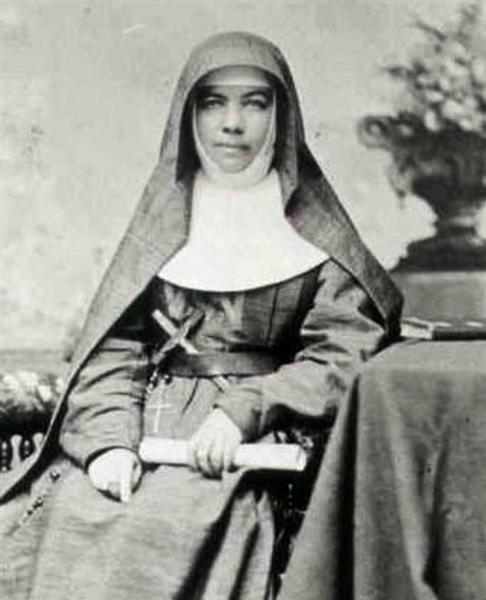
St. Mary MacKillop

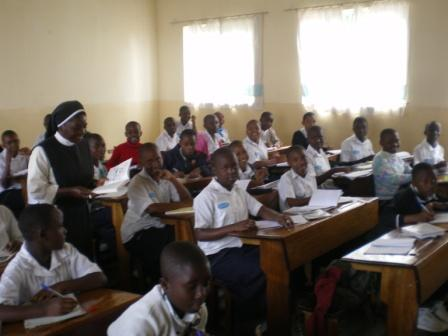
A Bernadine teacher in Congo

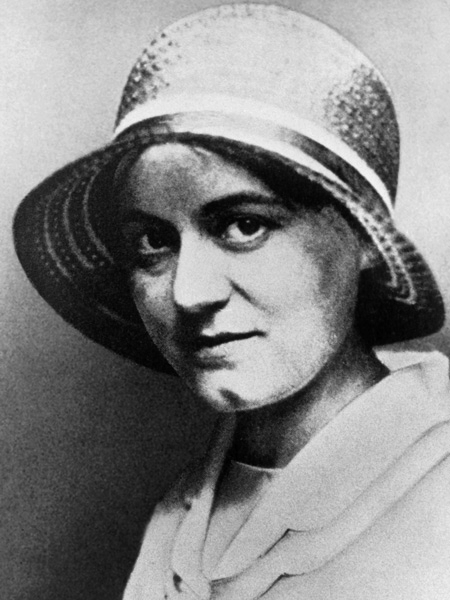
St. Edith Stein

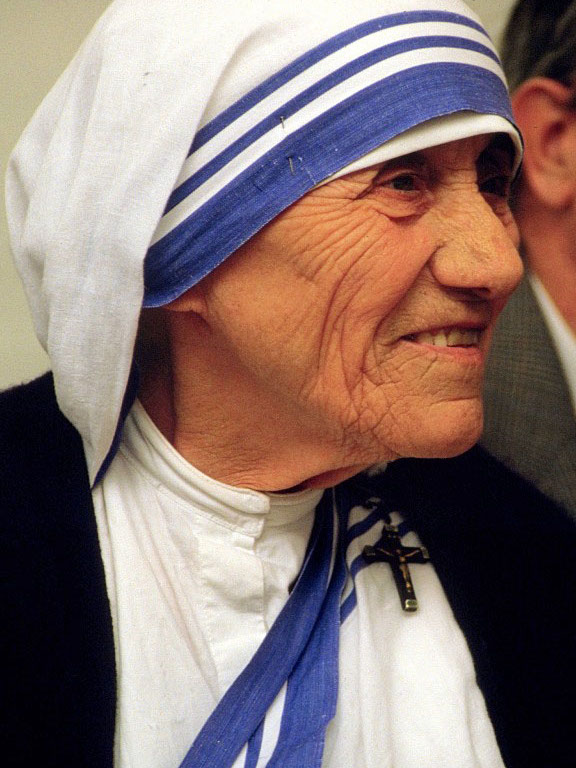
Mother Teresa

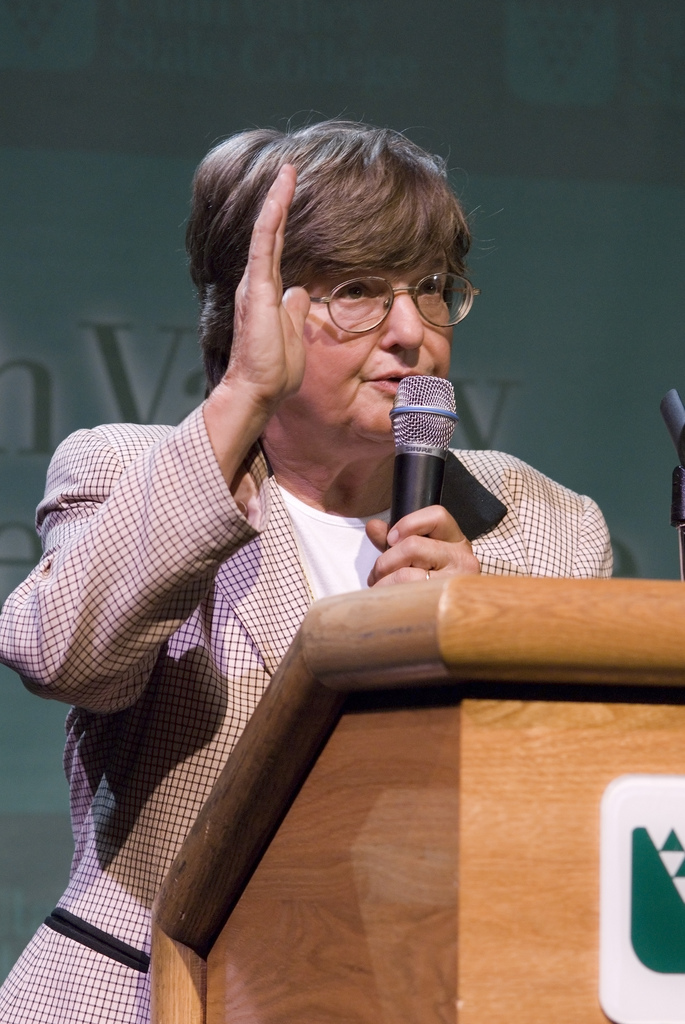
Sister Helen Prejean
Women play a significant role in the life of the Catholic Church, and the Church affects societal attitudes to women.

Women play significant roles in the life of the Catholic Church, although excluded from the Catholic hierarchy of bishops, priests, and deacons. In the history of the Catholic Church, the church often influenced social attitudes toward women. Influential Catholic women have included theologians, abbesses, monarchs, missionaries, mystics, martyrs, scientists, nurses, hospital administrators, educationalists, religious sisters, Doctors of the Church, and canonised saints. Women constitute the majority of members of consecrated life in the Catholic Church; in 2010, there were around 721,935 professed women religious. Motherhood and family are given an exalted status in Catholicism.

The Catholic Church has influenced the status of women in various ways: condemning abortion, divorce, incest, polygamy, and counting the marital infidelity of men as equally sinful to that of women. The role of women in the church has become a controversial topic in Catholic social thought. Christianity's overall effect on women is a matter of historical debate; it rose out of patriarchal societies but lessened the gulf between men and women. The institution of the convent has offered a space for female self-government, power, and influence through the centuries. According to some modern critiques, the Catholic Church's largely male hierarchy and refusal to ordain women implies "inferiority" of women. New feminism and feminist theology deal extensively with Catholic attitudes towards women. Yet, the Blessed Virgin Mary remains the most important human figure in the Catholic Church after Jesus Christ, who is also regarded as a true man.

== Women in the Bible ==
Prominent women in the Bible include Old Testament figures, particularly Eve in the Garden of Eden, which has affected the development of a Western notion of woman as "temptress".

The New Testament refers to a number of women in Jesus' inner circle – notably his mother Mary (for whom the Catholic Church holds a special place of veneration) and Mary Magdalene who discovered the empty tomb of Christ. The church says that Christ appointed only male Apostles (from the Greek apostello "to send forth").

The New Testament is instructive of the attitudes of the church towards women. Among the most famous accounts of Jesus directly dealing with an issue of morality and women is provided by the story of Jesus and the woman taken in adultery, from verses 7:53–8:11 of the Gospel of John. The passage describes a confrontation between Jesus and the scribes and Pharisees over whether a woman, caught in an act of adultery, ought to be stoned. Jesus shames the crowd into dispersing, and averts the execution with the famous words: "He that is without sin among you, let him first cast a stone at her." According to the passage, "they which heard it, being convicted by their own conscience, went out one by one, beginning at the eldest, even unto the last", leaving Jesus to turn to the woman and say "go, and sin no more." This passage has been immensely influential in Christian philosophy.

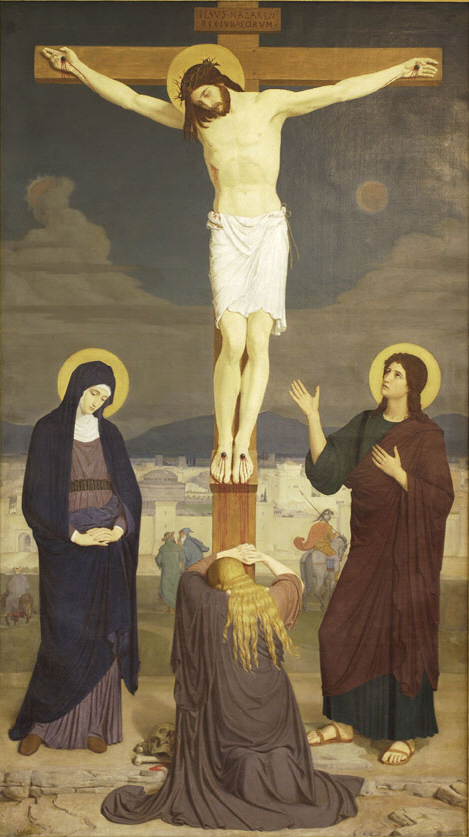
Mary Magdalene kneeling within a Stabat Mater scene by Gabriel Wuger, 1868

Jesus' own attitude to women is found in the story of Jesus at the house of Martha and Mary. The Gospels suggest Jesus broke with convention to provide religious instruction directly to women. Mary sits at Jesus' feet as he preaches, while her sister toils in the kitchen preparing a meal. When Martha complains to Mary that she should instead be helping in the kitchen, Jesus says that, "Mary has chosen what is better" (Luke 10:38–42).

== Virgin Mary ==
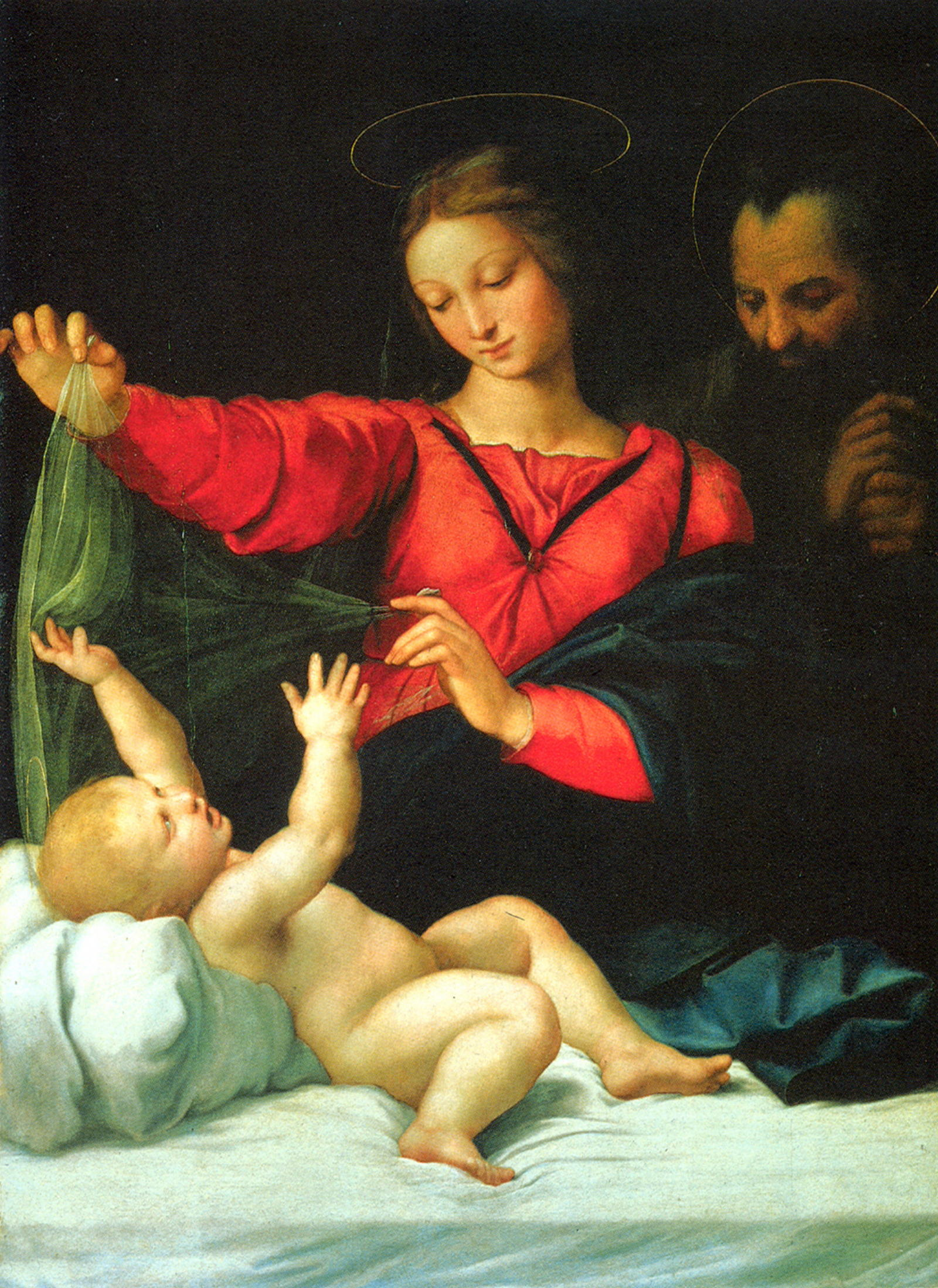
Madonna of Loreto by Raphael.

Mary was the mother of Jesus, and as such is highly venerated within the Catholic Church as the Mother of God. The church holds that she was immaculately conceived and, while betrothed to the carpenter Joseph, Mary was visited by the angel Gabriel who announced that, though a virgin, she would give birth to a son, Jesus. The Gospels give several other accounts of Mary, including that she was present at the feet of Jesus at the time of his crucifixion.

Her role has inspired vast quantities of Catholic art – notably images of the Madonna and Child – and various Catholic prayers, Marian hymns and devotions (notably the Hail Mary). Ave Maris Stella (English, "Hail Star of the Sea") is a plainsong Vespers hymn to Mary and inspiration for the English hymn Hail Holy Queen. The Salve Regina, also known as the Hail Holy Queen, is a Marian hymn and one of four Marian antiphons sung at different seasons. Its poetic verses portray Mary as a figure of hope in a time of trial.

As the mother of Jesus, Mary has a central role in the life of the Roman Catholic Church. Within the church she is seen as the Mother of God and the Mother of the Church. By the early Middle Ages, Marian devotion had become an integral part of Church life. Roman Catholic veneration of her as the "Blessed Virgin Mary" has grown over time both in importance and manifestation, in prayer, art, poetry and music. Popes have encouraged this veneration, although they have also taken steps to reform it. (Note: For example, Pope Paul VI reduced and rearranged the number of feast days March 12, 1969, Sanctitas Clarior, as did several of his predecessors.) Overall, there are significantly more titles, feasts and venerative Marian practices among Roman Catholics than any other Christians traditions. The feast day of the Assumption marks the assuming of Mary's body into Heaven.

The prominence of Mary in the life of the Church grew gradually. In AD 431, the Council of Ephesus granted Mary the title of Mother of God. In 553, the Council of Constantinople proclaimed that she was perpetually a virgin. In 863 AD, the pope pronounced the Feast of Our Lady to be equal to the feasts of Easter and Christmas. By the 12th Century, the Hail Mary prayer had become popular, which in turn led to the widespread use of the rosary. According to historian Geoffrey Blainey, Mary had become the "favoured intermediary through whom the ear of God could be reached". She had become an important subject for theologians and artists alike and churches were named after her throughout Christendom. She became known as "Queen of Heaven".

Prior to the solemn definition of 1870, the only agreed upon infallible definition from a pope apart from a council was that of the Immaculate Conception of Mary by Pope Pius IX in Ineffabilis Deus of 1854. The pope checked with bishops worldwide that this was the belief of the Church before proceeding to a formal definition.In 1950, Pope Pius XII defined the Assumption of Mary as an article of faith.

=== Other perspectives ===
Since the end of the 19th century, a number of progressive and liberal perspectives of Mariology have been presented, ranging from feminist criticisms to interpretations based on modern psychology and liberal Catholic viewpoints. These views are generally critical of the Roman Catholic approach to Mariology as well as the Eastern Catholic and Eastern Orthodox churches which have even more Marian emphasis within their official liturgies.

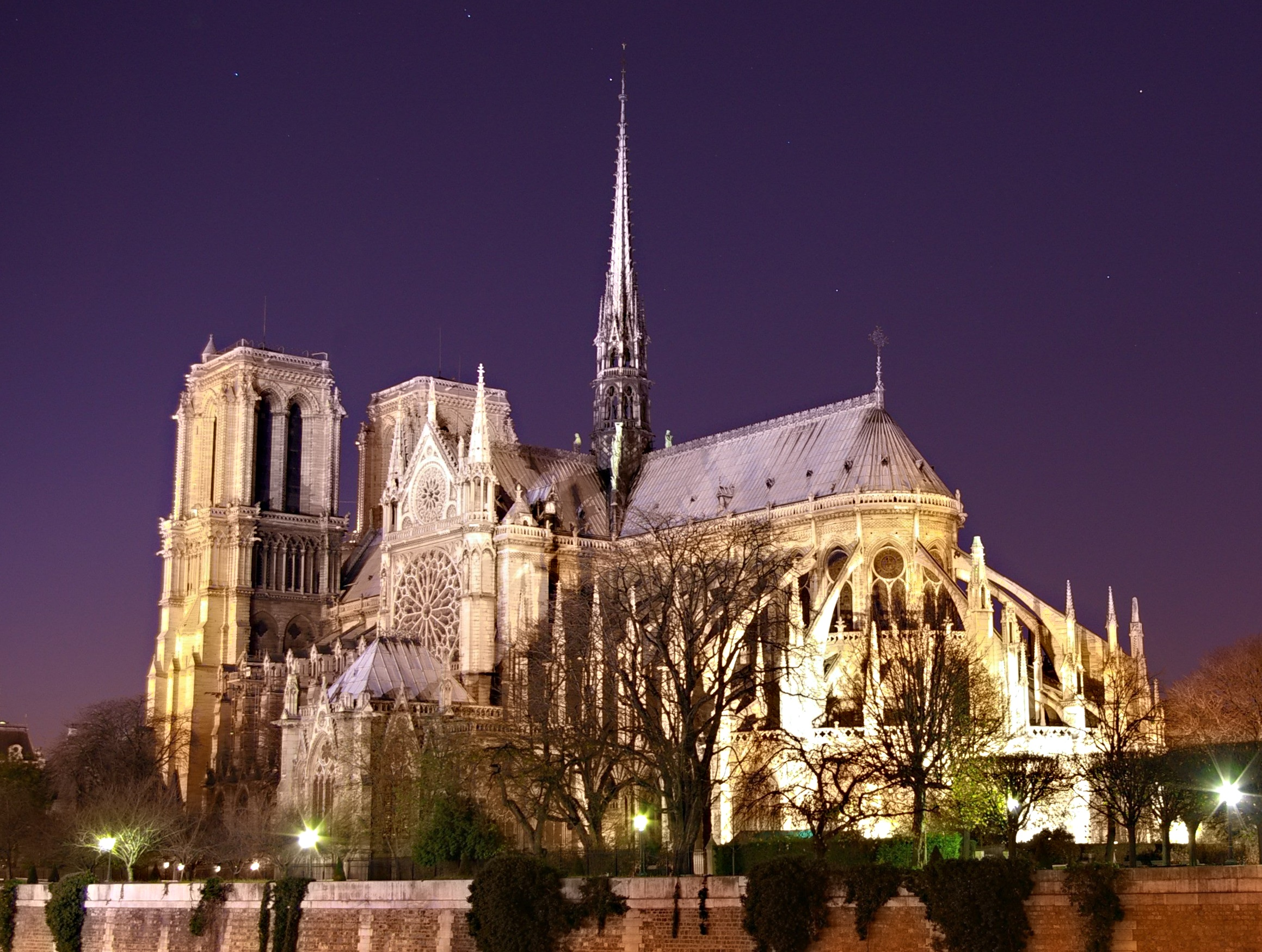
Notre Dame Cathedral, Paris, is one of many important cathedrals dedicated in honour of Our Lady (Mary, the mother of Jesus).

Some feminists contend that as with other women saints such as Joan of Arc the image of Mary is a construct of the patriarchal mind. They argue that Marian dogmas and doctrines and the typical forms of Marian devotion reinforce patriarchy by offering women temporary comfort from the ongoing oppression inflicted on them by male dominated churches and societies. In the feminist view, old gender stereotypes persist within traditional Marian teachings and theological doctrines. To that end books on "feminist Mariology" have been published to present opposing interpretations and perspectives.

Mary Reichardt comments that the Blessed Virgin Mary is "paradoxically, both virgin and mother, both submissive and the preeminent mulier fortis".

Since the Reformation, some Christian denominations have distanced themselves from Marian venerations, and that trend has continued into the 21st century among progressive Christians who see the high level of attention paid to the Virgin Mary both as being without sufficient grounding in Scripture and as distraction from the worship due to Christ.

Some groups of liberal Catholics have described the traditional image of the Virgin Mary as presented by the Catholic Church as an obstacle towards realization of the goal of womanhood, and as a symbol of the systemic patriarchal oppression of women within the Church. Some liberal Catholics have written of the cultivation of the traditional image of Mary as a method of manipulation of Catholics at large by the Church hierarchy. Other liberal Christians argue that the modern concepts of equal opportunity for men and women does not resonate well with a humble image of Mary, obediently and subserviently kneeling before Christ.

== Reproductive and family life ==
=== Virginity ===
Christian orthodoxy accepts the New Testament claim that Mary, the mother of Jesus, was a virgin at the time Jesus was conceived, based on the accounts in the gospels of Matthew and Luke. The Roman Catholic, Eastern Catholic, Eastern Orthodox, and Oriental Orthodox denominations, additionally hold to the dogma of the perpetual virginity of Mary.

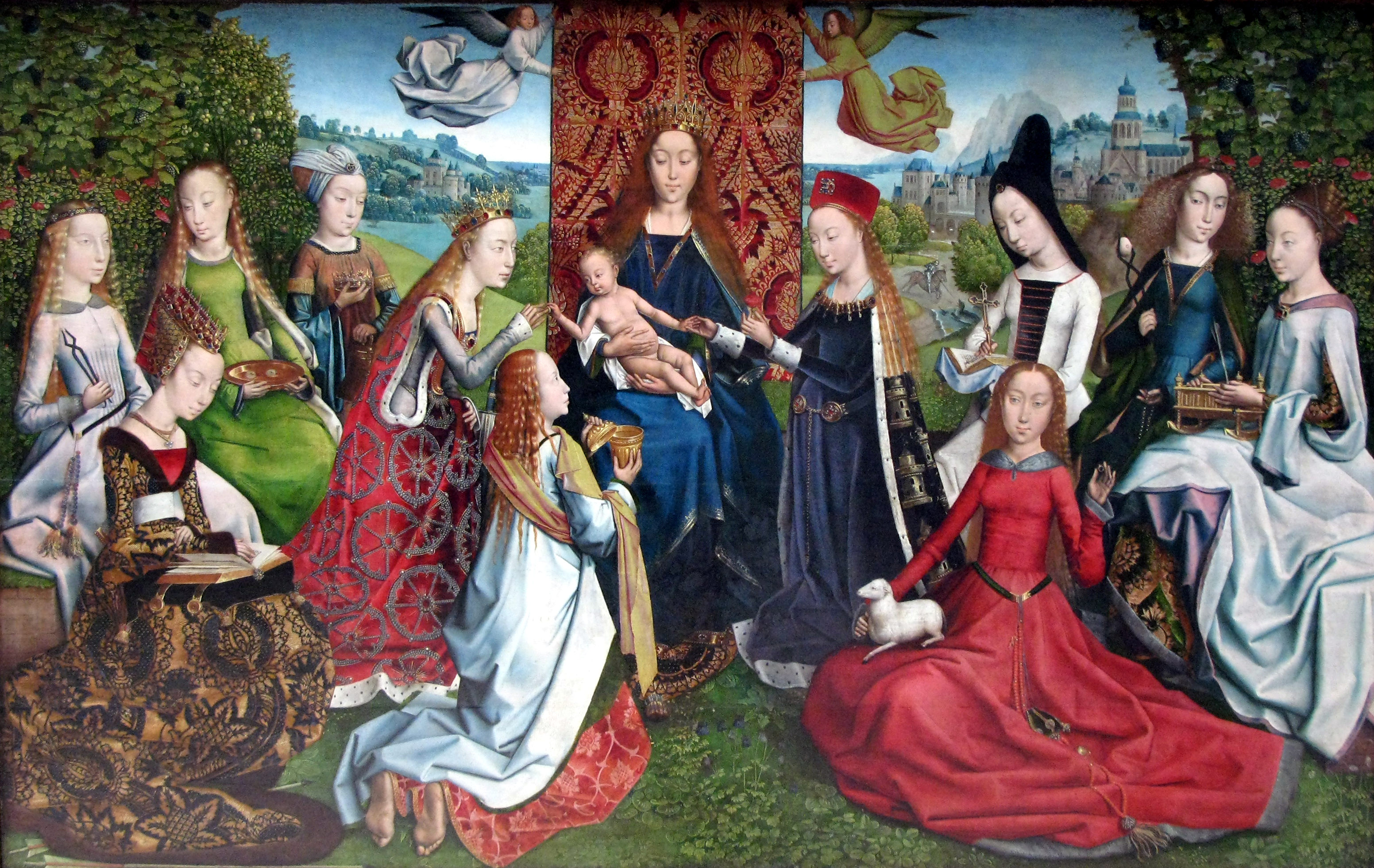
Virgo inter Virgines (The Blessed virgin Mary with other holy virgins), anonymous, Bruges, last quarter of the 15th century

The Catholic Encyclopedia says: "There are two elements in virginity: the material element, that is to say, the absence, in the past and in the present, of all complete and voluntary delectation, whether from lust or from the lawful use of marriage; and the formal element, that is the firm resolution to abstain forever from sexual pleasure." And, "Virginity is irreparably lost by sexual pleasure, voluntarily and completely experienced." However, for the purposes of consecrated virgins it is canonically enough that they have never been married or lived in open violation of chastity. This consecration can be bestowed either on women in monastic orders or on women living in the world, which revived the form of life that had been found in the early Church. The tradition of a ritual form of the consecration of virgin women dates to the 4th century, although it is widely held that a more informal consecration was imparted to virgin women by their bishops dating from the time of the Apostles. The first known formal rite of consecration of virginity is that of Saint Marcellina, dated AD 353, mentioned in De Virginibus by her brother, Saint Ambrose. Another early consecrated virgin is Saint Genevieve (c. 422 – c. 512).

Thomas Aquinas emphasized that acts other than copulation destroy virginity as well. He also clarified that involuntary sexual pleasure or pollution does not destroy virginity. In his Summa Theologica he states: "Pleasure resulting from resolution of semen may arise in two ways. If this be the result of the mind's purpose, it destroys virginity, whether copulation takes place or not."

Some female saints and blesseds are indicated by the church with the honorific title of a Virgin. These were consecrated virgins, nuns, religious sisters or women known for a life in perfect chastity. Being referred to as virgin can especially mean being a member of the Ordo Virginum ("Order of virgins"), which applies to the consecrated virgins living in the world or in monastic orders.

In 1963 the Second Vatican Council requested a revision of the rite of the consecration of virgins that was found in the Roman Pontifical; the revised Rite was approved by Pope Paul VI and published in 1970. This consecration can be bestowed either on women in monastic orders or on women living in the world, which revived the form of life that had been found in the early Church. As well, since the Second Vatican Council, the bishops of the Catholic Church have permitted women to serve in many lay ministries.

=== Marriage ===
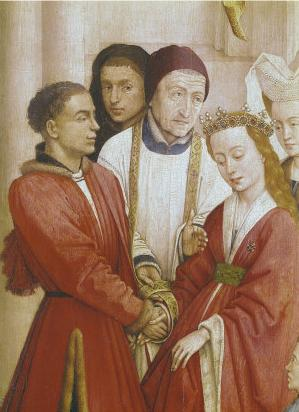
"Therefore what God has joined together, let not man separate." (Gospel of Matthew 19:6) Matrimony, The Seven Sacraments, Rogier van der Weyden, ca. 1445.

Catholic marriage is a "covenant, by which a man and a woman establish between themselves a partnership of the whole of life and which is ordered by its nature to the good of the spouses and the procreation and education of offspring, [which] has been raised by Christ the Lord to the dignity of a sacrament between the baptized." In the Latin Church, it is ordinarily celebrated in a Nuptial Mass.

The nature of the covenant requires that the two participants be one man and one woman, that they be free to marry, that they willingly and knowingly enter into a valid marriage contract, and that they validly execute the performance of the contract.

=== Divorce ===
In the Roman Empire, husbands were allowed to leave their wife. Wives were denied a reciprocal right. Early Church Fathers pointed to the Gospel of Mark, which describes Jesus labelling men or women who divorced and remarried as adulterers. Gregory of Nazianzus wrote vehemently against the practice of punishing women who committed adultery while overlooking the same acts by men.

Married women were attracted to the Christian ideal that men and women shared the same obligatory moral code. Women often converted first and introduced the religion to their social network; it was in this way that the religion often spread to the upper classes of society.

As the Church gained greater influence in European society, its teachings were occasionally codified into law. Church teaching heavily influenced the legal concept of marriage. During the Gregorian Reform of the 11th century, the Church developed and codified a view of marriage as a sacrament. In a departure from societal norms, Church law required the consent of both parties before a marriage could be performed and established a minimum age for marriage. The elevation of marriage to a sacrament also made the union a binding contract, with dissolutions overseen by Church authorities. Under canon law, spouses could be granted a "divorce a mensa et thoro" ("divorce from bed-and-board"). While the husband and wife physically separated and were forbidden to live or cohabit together, their marital relationship did not fully terminate. Alternatively, Church laws permitted spouses to petition for an annulment with proof that essential conditions for contracting a valid marriage were absent. Ecclesiastical courts would grant a "divorce a vinculo matrimonii", or "divorce from all the bonds of marriage"—a ruling that the marriage had never taken place—when presented evidence that the marriage had been invalid from its apparent start. Although the Church revised its practice to allow women the same rights as men to dissolve a marriage, in practice, at least throughout the Middle Ages, when an accusation of infidelity was made, men were granted dissolutions more frequently than women.

Several Biblical passages imply subordination, such as "Let wives also be subject in everything to their husbands" (Eph. 5:24). In 1988, Pope John Paul II clarified that "subordinate" should be defined as a "mutual subjection out of reverence for Christ."

=== Contraception ===
The Catholic Church is morally opposed to contraception and orgasmic acts outside of the context of marital intercourse. This belief dates back to the first centuries of Christianity. Such acts are considered illicit mortal sins, with the belief that all licit sexual acts must be open to procreation.

The sexual revolution of the 1960s precipitated Pope Paul VI's 1968 encyclical Humanae Vitae (On Human Life) which rejected the use of contraception, including sterilization, claiming these work against the intimate relationship and moral order of husband and wife by directly opposing God's will. It approved Natural Family Planning as a legitimate means to limit family size.

The only form of birth control permitted is abstinence. Modern scientific methods of "periodic abstinence" such as Natural Family Planning (NFP) were counted as a form of abstinence by Pope Paul VI in his 1968 encyclical Humanae Vitae. The following is the condemnation of contraception:

Therefore We base Our words on the first principles of a human and Christian doctrine of marriage when We are obliged once more to declare that the direct interruption of the generative process already begun and, above all, all direct abortion, even for therapeutic reasons, are to be absolutely excluded as lawful means of regulating the number of children. Equally to be condemned, as the magisterium of the Church has affirmed on many occasions, is direct sterilization, whether of the man or of the woman, whether permanent or temporary. Similarly excluded is any action which either before, at the moment of, or after sexual intercourse, is specifically intended to prevent procreation—whether as an end or as a means.

=== Abortion ===
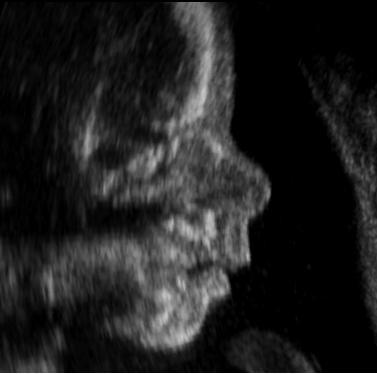
A human fetus. The Catholic Church opposes abortion.

The Roman Catholic Church opposes all forms of abortion procedures whose intended and primary purpose is to destroy an embryo, blastocyst, zygote or fetus. This is rooted in the belief of equality of all human life, and that human life begins at conception. 'Indirect abortion,' by which Catholic jurists mean a particular procedure in the case of ectopic pregnancy where the death of the fetus is said to be a secondary effect of the procedure, may be permissible. Catholics who procure abortion are considered to be automatically excommunicated, as per Canon 1398 of the Latin Rite 1983 Code of Canon Law or Canon 1450 § 2 of the Code of Canons of the Eastern Churches.

The Catholic Church regards abortion as a 'moral evil'. Abortion was condemned by the Church as early as the first century, again in the fourteenth century and again in 1995 with Pope John Paul II's encyclical Evangelium Vitae (Gospel of Life). This encyclical condemned the "culture of death" which the pope often used to describe the societal embrace of contraception, abortion, euthanasia, suicide, capital punishment, and genocide.

In March 2019, the Vatican-published magazine Women Church World experienced a series of staff resignations over alleged whitewashing attempts by male management. The month before, the magazine had "exposed the sexual abuse by priests of nuns who are forced to have abortions or give birth to children who are not recognized by their fathers. The article said nuns have kept silent about the abuse for years out of fear of retribution." Pope Francis had acknowledged the abuse after the article.

=== Menstruation ===
In 735, the Latin Church, but not the Eastern Churches, decided that women must be allowed to attend liturgies and receive Holy Communion during their menstruation.

== Roles of women ==
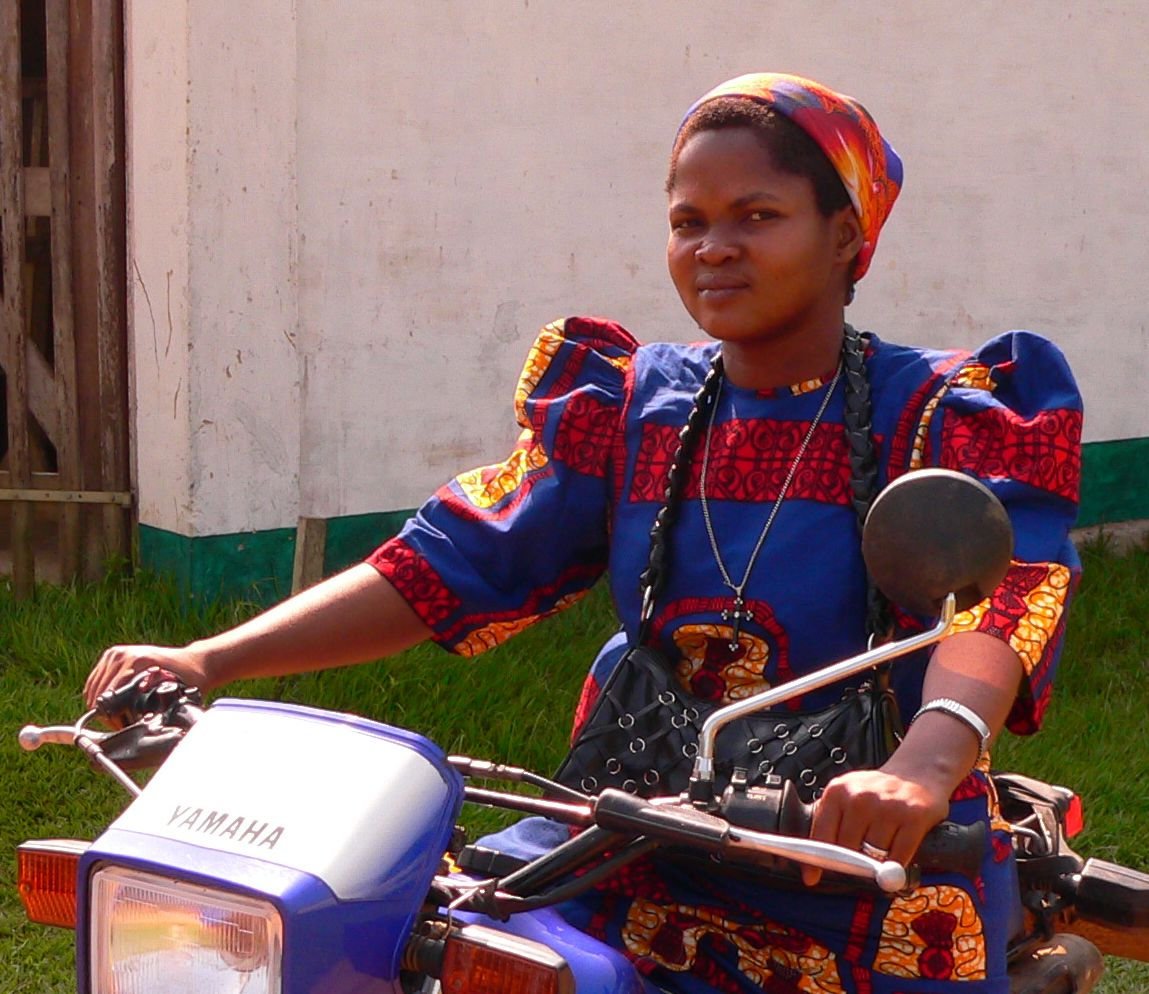
A Catholic religious sister in brightly coloured clothes rides a motor-bike in Basankusu, Democratic Republic of Congo.

Women constitute the great majority of members of the consecrated life within the church. Catholic women have played diverse roles, with religious institutes providing a formal space for their participation and convents providing spaces for their self-government, prayer and influence through many centuries. Catholic women have played a formidable role as educationalists and health care administrators, with religious sisters and nuns extensively involved in developing and running the church's worldwide health and education service networks.

In religious vocations, Catholic women and men are ascribed different roles, with women serving as nuns, religious sisters or abbesses, but in other roles, the Catholic Church does not distinguish between men and women, who may be equally recognised as saints, doctors of the church, catechists in schools, altar servers, acolytes, extraordinary ministers of Holy Communion at Mass, or as readers (lectors) during the liturgy.

=== Abbess and prioress ===
An abbess, as defined by the Thomas Oestereich, writing in the Catholic Encyclopedia, is the female superior in spirituals and temporals of a community of 12 or more nuns.

The historical roles of abbesses have varied. In medieval times, abbesses were powerful figures whose influence could rival that of male bishops and abbots: "They treated with kings, bishops, and the greatest lords on terms of perfect equality; ... they were present at all great religious and national solemnities, at the dedication of churches, and even, like the queens, took part in the deliberation of the national assemblies..." In England, abbesses of major houses attended all great religious and national solemnities, such as deliberations of the national assemblies and ecclesiastical councils. In Germany the major abbesses were ranked among the princes of the Empire, enabling them to sit and vote in the Diet. They lived in fine estates, and recognised no church superior save the Pope. Similarly in France, Italy and Spain, female superiors could be very powerful figures. In Celtic Christianity, abbesses could preside over houses containing both monks and nuns and in mediaeval Europe, abbesses could be immensely influential, sitting in national parliaments and ruling their conventual estates like temporal lords, recognising no church superior save the Pope. In modern times, abbesses have lost their aristocratic trappings.

Her duties, authority, and method of election are similar to those of an abbot. She is elected by the votes of the religious sisters over whom she will be given authority. An abbess has supreme domestic authority over a monastery and its dependencies, though she does not formally "preach" in the way of a priest, she may "exhort her nuns by conferences". She may discipline, but not excommunicate members of her monastery.

A prioress is a monastic superior for nuns, usually lower in rank than an abbess. Abbesses and prioresses may also be known as "mother superior". They remain influential within the church.

=== Religious vocations ===
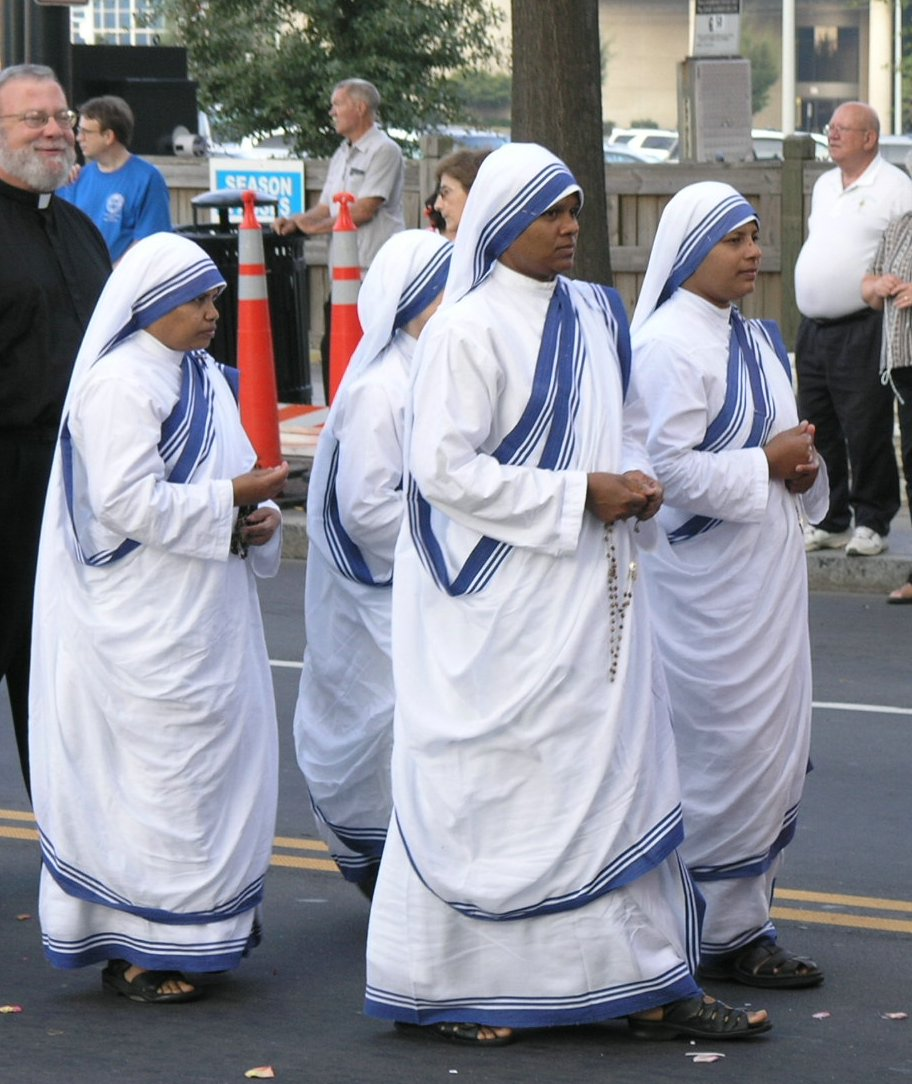
Mother Teresa's Missionaries of Charity wearing traditional Indian saris

In religious vocations, Catholic women and men are ascribed different roles. Men serve as deacons, priests, friars, monks, brothers, abbots or in episcopal positions while women serve as nuns, religious sisters, abbesses or prioresses. Women are engaged in a variety of vocations, from contemplative prayer, to teaching, providing health care and working as missionaries. In 2006, the number of nuns worldwide had been in decline, but women still constituted around 753,400 members of the consecrated life, of a total worldwide membership of around 945,210. Of these members, 191,810 were men – including around 136,171 priests.Nuns and sisters may house themselves in convents – though an abbey may host a religious community of men or women. There are many different women's religious institutes and societies of apostolic life, each with its own charism or special character.

Religious institutes for women may be dedicated to contemplative or monastic life or to apostolic work such as education or the provision of health care and spiritual support to the community. Some religious institutes have ancient origins, as with Benedictine nuns, whose monastic way of life developed from the 6th-century Rule of Saint Benedict. Benedict of Nursia is considered the father of western monasticism and his sister, Scholastica, is the patron saint of nuns. In religious institutes for women that are called orders (those in which solemn vows are taken), the members are called nuns; if they are devoted completely to contemplation, they adopt the strict form of cloister or enclosure known as papal cloister, while other nuns perform apostolic work outside their monasteries and are cloistered or enclosed only to the degree established by their rule, a form known as constitutional cloister. Women members of religious institutes that are called congregations are not required by canon law to be cloistered are referred to, strictly speaking, as sisters rather than nuns, although in common use the two terms are often used interchangeably.

Women may also become numenaries in Opus Dei, they live separately from their male counterparts in Opus Dei, but are not cloistered from men.

In Celtic Christianity, abbesses could preside over houses containing both monks and nuns (male and female religious), a practice brought to continental Europe by Celtic missionaries. Irish hagiography holds that, as Europe was entering the Medieval Age, the abbess Brigid of Kildare was founding monasteries across Ireland. The Celtic Church played an important role in restoring Christianity to Western Europe following the Fall of Rome, and so the work of nuns like Brigid is significant in Christian history. The abbess Hilda of Whitby was an important figure in the Christianisation of Anglo-Saxon England.

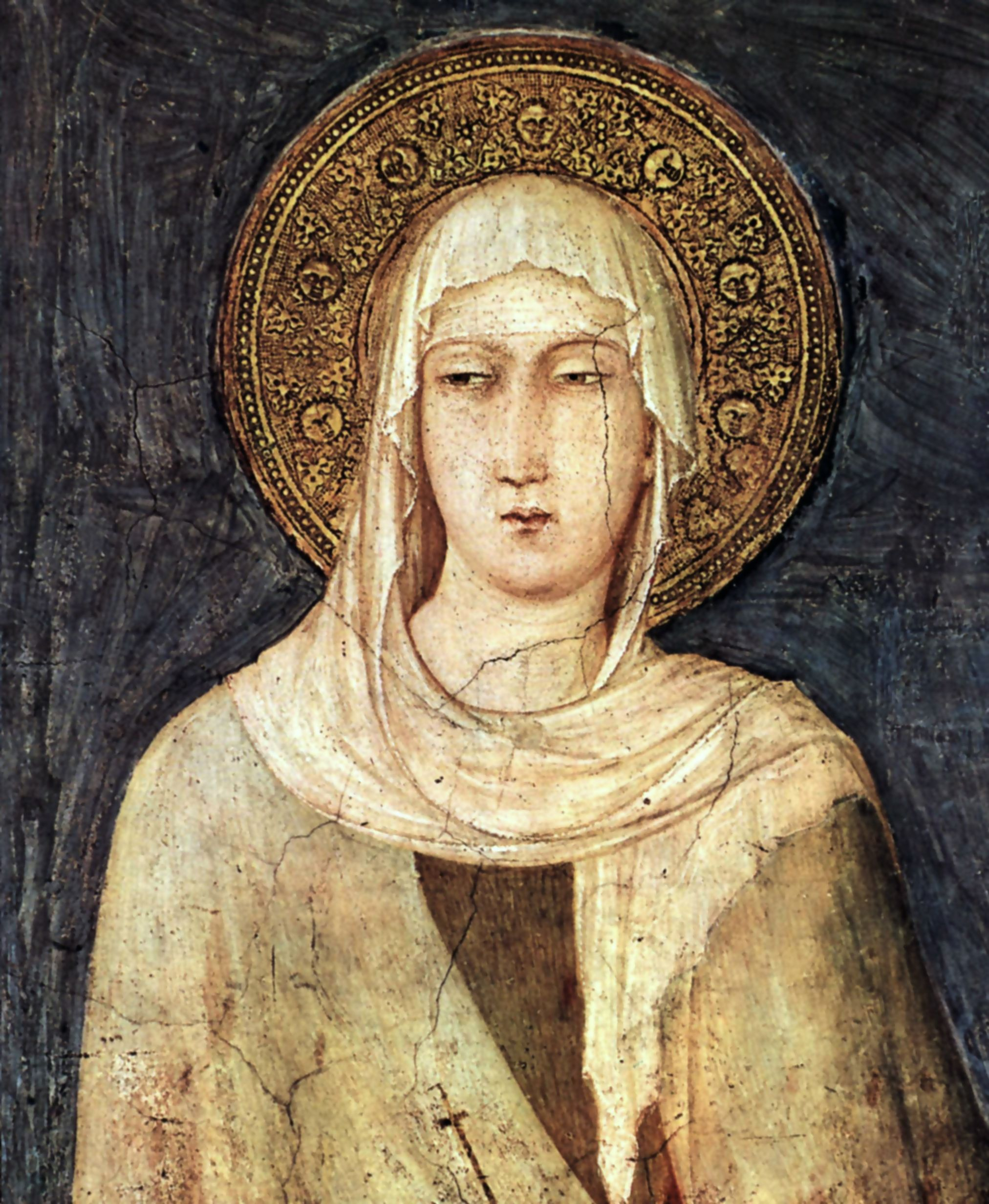
Clare of Assisi

Clare of Assisi was one of the first followers of Saint Francis of Assisi. She founded the Order of Poor Ladies, a contemplative monastic religious order for women in the Franciscan tradition, and wrote their Rule of Life – the first monastic rule known to have been written by a woman. Following her death, the order she founded was renamed in her honor as the Order of Saint Clare, commonly referred to today as the Poor Clares.

An example is provided by the 12th-century Speculum Virginum (Mirror of Virgins in Latin) document which provides one of the earliest comprehensive theologies of cloistered religious life. The growth of the various manuscripts of the Speculum Virginum in the Middle Ages had a particular resonance for women who sought a dedicated religious life. Yet, its effect on the development of female monastic life also influenced the proliferation of male monastic orders.

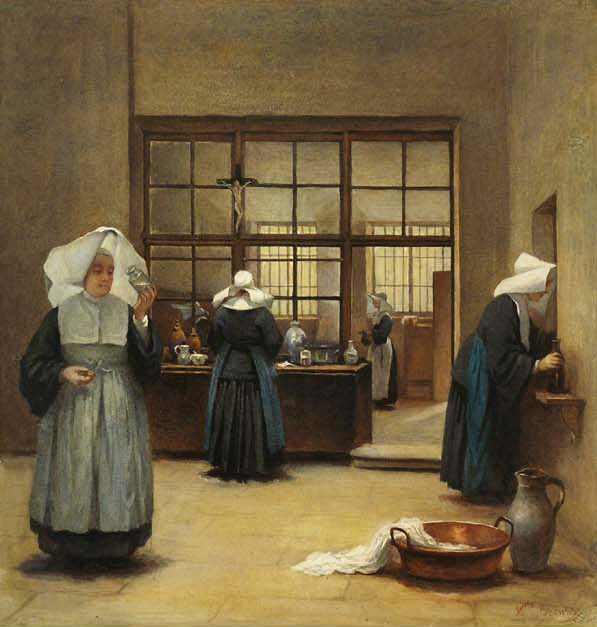
Nuns at Work in the Cloister, by Henriette Browne

Saint Dominic founded the Dominican movement in France in the 12th century and Dominican nuns have gathered in contemplative religious communities ever since.

Kateri Tekakwitha was born around 1656 in the Mohawk village of Ossernenon, Canada. Canonised as the first Native American saint in 2012, Takakwitha lived at a time of conflict between the Mohawks and French colonists, lost her family and was scarred by smallpox before converting to Catholicism, leading to persecution from her tribesmen. She became known for her piety and charity. Elizabeth Ann Seton was born in New York. She would become the first saint born in the newly declared United States of America. A Catholic convert, she was attracted to the spirituality of St. Vincent de Paul and founded a religious community dedicated to the care of the children of the poor – the first congregation of religious sisters founded in the US.

The Sisters of Mercy was founded by Catherine McAuley in Dublin, Ireland, in 1831, and her nuns went on to establish hospitals and schools across the world. The Little Sisters of the Poor was founded in the mid-19th century by Saint Jeanne Jugan near Rennes, France, to care for the many impoverished elderly who lined the streets of French towns and cities. In Britain's Australian colonies, Australia's first canonised Saint, Mary MacKillop, co-founded the Sisters of St. Joseph of the Sacred Heart as an educative religious institute for the poor in 1866. Tension with the local male hierarchy culminated in the local archbishop attempting to excommunicate her. Pope Pius IX's personal approval permitted her to continue her work and by the time of her death her institute had established a 117 schools and had opened orphanages and refuges for the needy.

In 2012, the largest women's institute was the Salesian Sisters of Don Bosco (also known as the Daughters of Mary Help of Christians) who had 14,091 members living in 1,436 communities in 94 countries. In numerical terms they were followed by the Carmelites (9,413), Claretian Sisters (7,171), Franciscan Clarist Congregation (7,076) and Franciscan Missionaries of Mary (6,698).

The number of professed women religious has been decreasing in recent decades. Worldwide, the number dropped from around 729,371 in 2009 to around 721,935 in 2010. The decline resulted from trends in Europe, America and Oceania (-2.9% in Europe, in Oceania -2.6% and -1.6% in America), however In Africa and Asia, there was a significant increase of 2%.

The website of the Vicariate of Rome gives a list of over 700 religious institutes for women.

=== Contemplatives and mystics ===
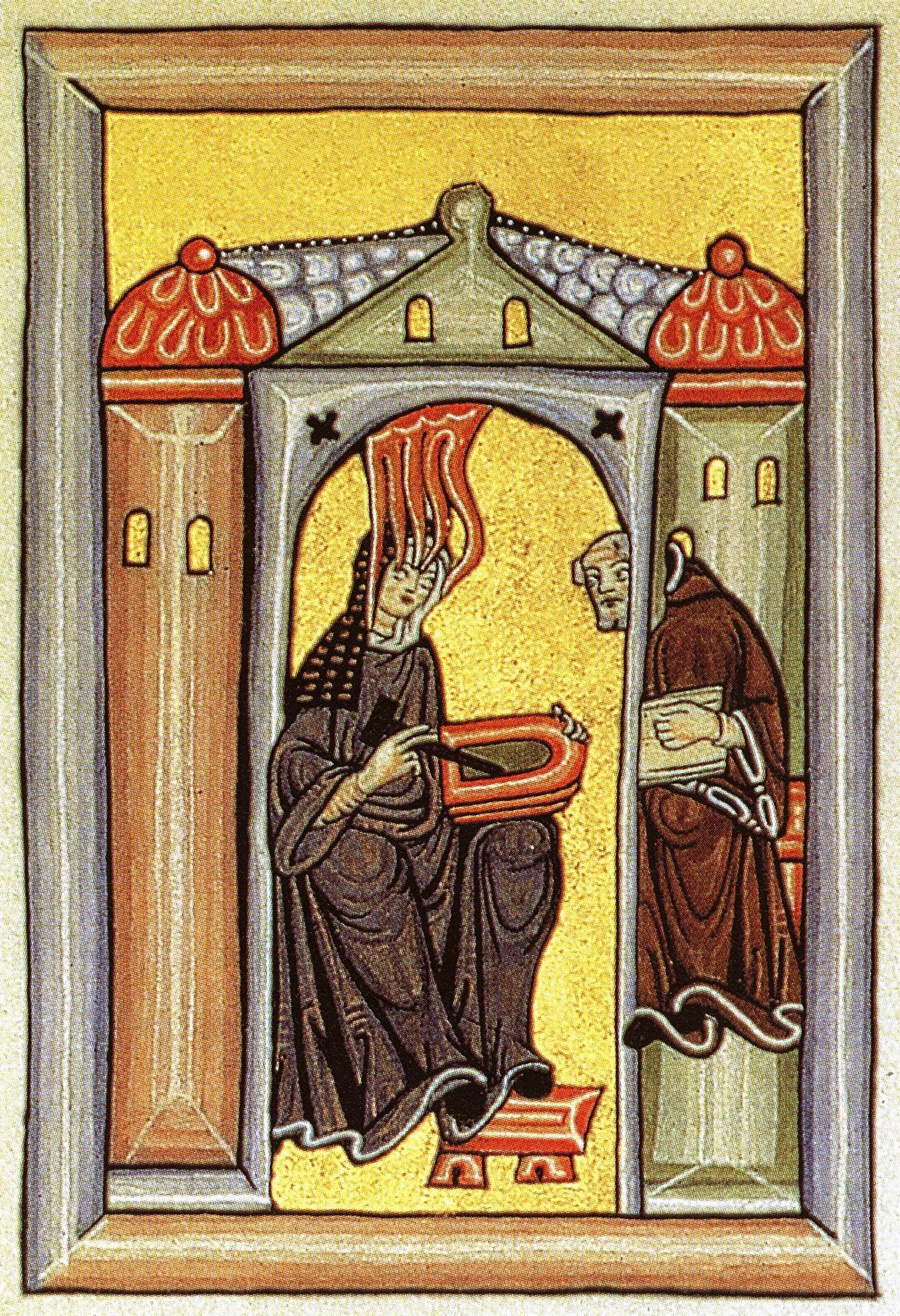
Illumination from the Liber Scivias showing Doctor of the Church Hildegard of Bingen receiving a vision and dictating to her scribe and secretary

Some religious institutes host communities who devote their lives to contemplation. Many Catholic women, both lay and in religious orders, have become influential mystics.

According to Bynum, during the 12th-15th centuries there was an unprecedented flowering of mysticism among female members of religious orders in the Catholic Church. Petra Munro describes these women as "transgressing gender norms" by violating the dictates of the Apostle Paul that "women should not speak, teach or have authority" (1 Timothy 2:12). Munro notes that, although the number of female mystics was "significant", we tend to be more familiar with male figures such as Bernard of Clairvaux, Francis of Assisi, Thomas Aquinas or Meister Eckhart than with Hildegard of Bingen, Julian of Norwich, Mechthild of Magdeburg, or Hadewijch of Antwerp.

Joan of Arc is considered a national heroine of France. She began life as a pious peasant girl. As with other saints of the period, Joan is said to have experienced supernatural dialogues that gave her spiritual insight and directed her actions. But, unlike typical heroines of the period, she donned male attire and, claiming divine guidance, sought out King Charles VII of France to offer help in a military campaign against the English. Taking up a sword, she achieved military victories before being captured. Her English captors and their Burgundian allies arranged for her to be tried as a "witch and heretic", after which she was convicted and burned at the stake. A papal inquiry later declared the trial illegal. A hero to the French, Joan inspired sympathy even in England, and in 1909 she was canonised as a Catholic saint.

Although various devotions to the Sacred Heart had been practiced as early as the second century, and Saint John Eudes had written about it shortly before Margaret Mary Alacoque, her reported 1673 visions of Jesus were instrumental in establishing the modern devotion. Alacoque established the devotion for receiving Holy Communion as the First Friday Devotions for each month, and Eucharistic adoration during the Holy Hour on Thursdays, and the celebration of the Feast of the Sacred Heart. She stated that in her vision she was instructed to spend an hour every Thursday night to meditate on the sufferings of Jesus in the Garden of Gethsemane. The Holy Hour practice later became widespread among Catholics.

The Sacred Heart devotion was later influenced by another Catholic nun, Mary of the Divine Heart, who initiated the first act of consecration for non-Christians. In 1898, through her superiors, she wrote to Pope Leo XIII that she had received a message from Christ, requesting the pope to consecrate the entire world to the Sacred Heart. In a second letter she referred to the recent illness of the pope in a way that the pope was convinced, despite the theological issues concerning the consecration of non-Christians. Leo XIII referred to the issue in the 1899 encyclical Annum sacrum in which he included the Prayer of Consecration to the Sacred Heart he composed as a result.: Leo XIII called the consecration which Sister Mary had requested "the greatest act of my pontificate".

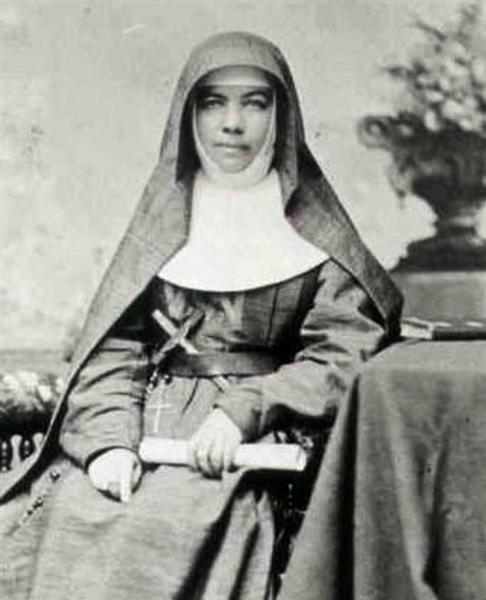
Mary MacKillop

Sister Marie of St. Peter, a Carmelite nun in Tours France started the devotion to the Holy Face of Jesus in 1843. She also wrote of the Golden Arrow Prayer. The devotion was further promoted by Blessed Maria Pierina and the Holy Face Medal was approved by pope Pius XII who based on the devotions started by the two nuns formally declared the Feast of the Holy Face of Jesus as Shrove Tuesday.

In 1858 Saint Bernadette Soubirous, a 14-year-old shepherd girl, reported the Lourdes apparitions. She asked the local priest to build a local chapel in Lourdes because the Lady with the Rosary beads had requested it. Eventually, a number of chapels and churches were built at Lourdes as the Sanctuary of Our Lady of Lourdes—which is now a major Catholic pilgrimage site with about five million pilgrims a year.

=== Theologians and scholars ===
Through its support for institutionalised learning, the Catholic Church produced many of the world's first notable women scientists and scholars – including the physicians Trotula of Salerno (11th century) and Dorotea Bucca (d. 1436), the philosopher Elena Piscopia (d. 1684) and the mathematician Maria Gaetana Agnesi (d. 1799).In the latter 20th century four Catholic women were declared Doctors of the Church: the 12th-century mystic Hildegard of Bingen, the 16th-century Spanish mystic, St Teresa of Ávila (who became the first female Doctor of the Church in 1970); the 14th-century Italian mystic St Catherine of Siena and the 19th-century French nun St Thérèse de Lisieux (called Doctor Amoris or "Doctor of Love").

=== Care givers ===
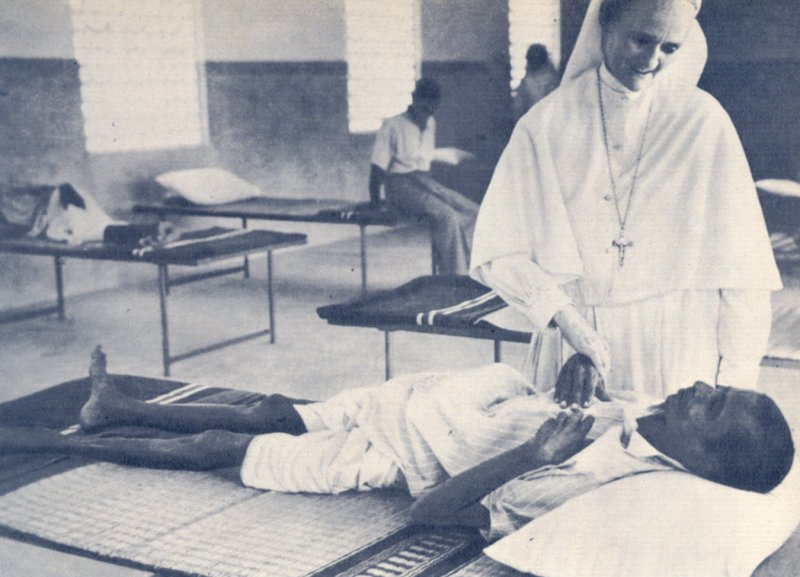
Salesian sister caring for sick and poor in former Madras Presidency, India. Catholic women have been heavily involved as educationalists and care givers.

In keeping with the emphasis of Catholic social teaching, many religious institutes for women have devoted themselves to service of the sick, homeless, disabled, orphaned, aged or mentally ill, as well as refugees, prisoners and others facing misfortune.

Ancient orders like the Dominicans and Carmelites have long lived in religious communities that work in ministries such as education and care of the sick. The Poor Clares comprise several orders of nuns and were the second Franciscan order to be established by Saints Clare of Assisi and Francis of Assisi – the Franciscan element serves as inspiration to two of the largest religious institutes for women in the Catholic Church – the Franciscan Clarist Congregation and Franciscan Missionaries of Mary.

The Claretian Sisters were founded in 1855 Venerable María Antonia París, growing to be the third largest women's institute in the church by 2012.

Saint Jeanne Jugan founded the Little Sisters of the Poor on the Rule of Saint Augustine to assist the impoverished elderly of the streets of France in the mid-nineteenth century. It too spread around the world. In Britain's Australian colonies in 1866, Saint Mary MacKillop co-founded the Sisters of St. Joseph of the Sacred Heart who began educating the rural poor and grew to establish schools and hospices throughout Oceania.

In the United States, the Sisters of St. Mary was founded in 1872 by Mother Mary Odilia Berger. These sisters went on to establish a large network of hospitals across America. The Sisters of Saint Francis of Syracuse, New York produced Saint Marianne Cope, who opened and operated some of the first general hospitals in the United States, instituting cleanliness standards which influenced the development of America's modern hospital system, and famously taking her nuns to Hawaii to care for lepers.

Saint Marianne Cope opened and operated some of the first general hospitals in the United States. There she instituted cleanliness standards which cut the spread of disease and influenced the development of America's modern hospital system. In 1883, she responded to a call from the King of Hawaii for help caring for leprosy suffers. There she established hospitals and eventually went to the exile island of Molokai to nurse the dying St Damien of Molokai and care for the island's leper colony. She was canonised in 2012, along with Maria Carmen Salles y Barangueras, Anna Schaffer and Kateri Tekakwitha.

Mother Teresa of Calcutta began working in the slums of Calcutta in 1948 and in 1950 established there the Missionaries of Charity, to work among "the poorest of the poor". Initially founding a school, she then gathered other sisters who "rescued new-born babies abandoned on rubbish heaps; they sought out the sick; they took in lepers, the unemployed, and the mentally ill". Teresa achieved fame in the 1960s and began to establish convents around the world. By the time of her death in 1997, the religious institute she founded had more than 450 centres in over 100 countries.

Many other religious institutes for women have been established down through the centuries, though in the West, their work in education and medical care is increasingly being taken up by laypeople.

=== Catholic nobility ===
One of the most notable Christian noblewomen is Helena of Constantinople, the mother of the Emperor Constantine. Constantine's Edict of Milan of AD 303 ended the persecution of Christians in the Roman Empire and his own conversion to Christianity was a significant turning point in history.

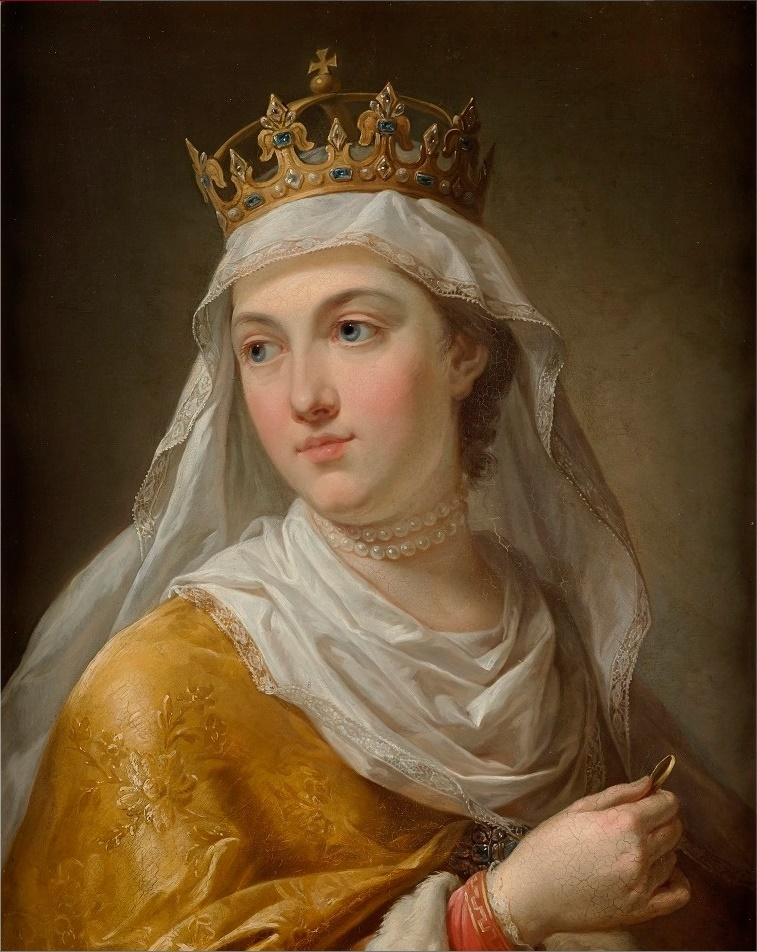
Jadwiga of Poland

During the Medieval period, aristocratic women could wield considerable influence. The first Russian ruler to convert to Christianity was Olga of Kiev around AD 950. She is an important figure in the spread of Christianity to Russia and remembered as a saint by the Catholic and Orthodox churches alike. Italian noblewoman Matilda of Tuscany (1046–1115) is remembered for her military accomplishments and for being the principal Italian supporter of Pope Gregory VII during the Investiture Controversy. Saint Hedwig of Silesia (1174–1243) supported the poor and the church in Eastern Europe, and Jadwiga of Poland reigned as monarch of Poland; she is the patroness saint of queens and of a "united Europe". Saint Elisabeth of Hungary (1207–1231) was a symbol of Christian charity who used her wealth to establish hospitals and care for the poor. Each of these women were singled out as model Christians by Pope John Paul II in his Mulieris Dignitatem letter on the dignity and vocation of women. Elisabeth's cousin, Saint Elizabeth of Portugal, was also recognized for her Christian charity and as a famous Franciscan tertiary.

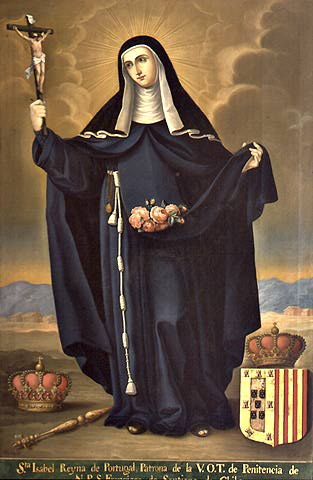
Elizabeth of Portugal

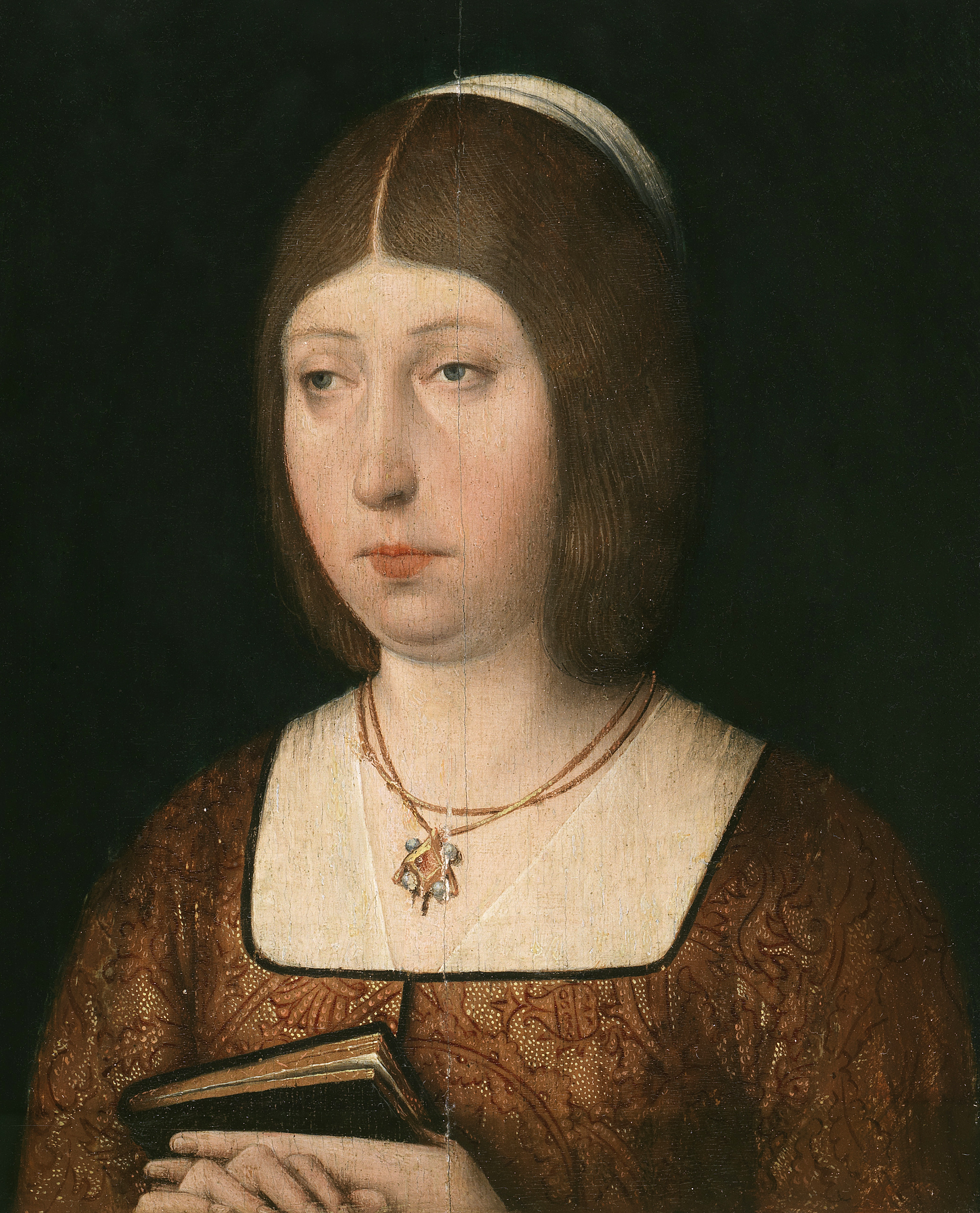
Isabella I of Castille

As sponsor of Christopher Columbus' 1492 mission to cross the Atlantic, the Spanish Queen Isabella I of Castille (known as Isabella the Catholic), was an important figure in the growth of Catholicism as a global religion. Spain and Portugal sent explorers and settlers to follow Columbus' route and establish vast Empires in the Americas, where they converted Native Americans to Catholicism. Her marriage to Ferdinand II of Aragon had ensured the unity of the Spanish Kingdom and the royal couple agreed to hold equal authority. Spanish Pope Alexander VI conferred on them the title "Catholic". As part of legal reforms to consolidate their authority, Isabella and Ferdinand instigated the Spanish Inquisition. The Catholic Monarchs then conquered the last Moorish bastion in Spain at Granada in January 1492 and seven months later, Columbus sailed for the Americas. The Catholic Encyclopedia credits Isabella as an extremely able ruler and one who "fostered learning not only in the universities and among the nobles, but also among women". Of Isabella and Ferdinand, it says: "The good government of the Catholic sovereigns brought the prosperity of Spain to its apogee, and inaugurated that country's Golden Age."

After the refusal of Pope Clement VII to grant an annulment in the marriage of King Henry VIII to Catherine of Aragon, Henry established himself as supreme governor of the church in England. Rivalry between Catholic and Protestant heirs ensued. Mary I of England was his eldest daughter and succeeded the throne after the death of her Protestant younger half-brother Edward VI. Later nicknamed "Bloody Mary" for her actions against Protestants, she was the daughter of Catherine of Aragon; she remained loyal to Rome and sought to restore the Roman Church in England. Her re-establishment of Roman Catholicism was reversed after her death in 1558 by her successor and younger half-sister, Elizabeth I. Rivalry emerged between Elizabeth and the Catholic Mary, Queen of Scots, finally settled with the execution of Mary in 1587. The religion of an heir or monarch's spouse complicated intermarriage between royal houses of Europe through coming centuries, as northern European nations became predominately Protestant.

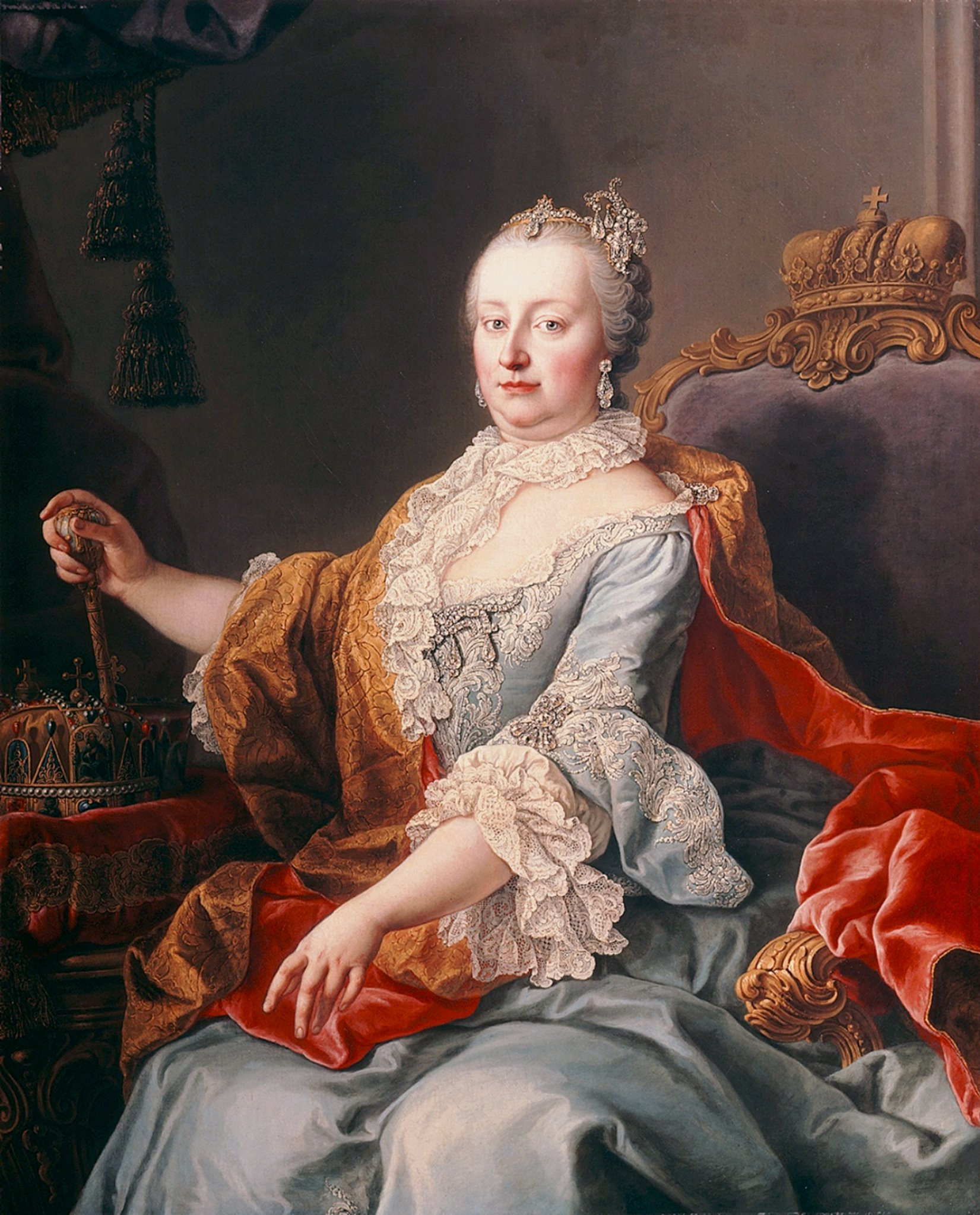
Maria Theresa of Austria

Maria Theresa of Austria acquired her right to the throne of the Habsburg dominions by means of the Pragmatic Sanction of 1713, allowing for female succession – but had to fight the War of the Austrian Succession to secure that right. Following victories, her husband, Francis Stephen, was chosen as Holy Roman Emperor in 1745, confirming Maria Theresa's status as a European leader. A liberal-minded autocrat, she was a patron of sciences and education and sought to alleviate the suffering of the serfs. On religion she pursued a policy of cujus regio, ejus religio, keeping Catholic observance at court and frowning on Judaism and Protestantism. The ascent of her son as co-regnant Emperor saw restrictions placed on the power of the Church in the Empire. She reigned for 40 years, and mothered 16 children including Marie-Antoinette, the ill-fated Queen of France. With her husband she founded the Catholic Habsburg-Lorraine Dynasty, who remained central players in European politics into the 20th century.

Of the remaining European monarchies, all are now constitutional monarchies, with some still ruled by Catholic dynasties, including the Spanish and Belgian Royal Families and the House of Grimaldi in Monaco. Many non-aristocratic Catholic women have served in public office in the modern era.

=== Educationalists ===
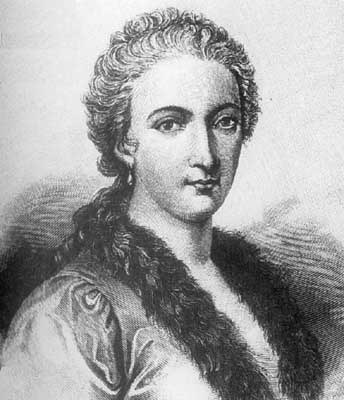
Maria Agnesi, Italian mathematician and theologian and the first woman to become professor of mathematics, appointed by Pope Benedict XIV around 1750

Education of the young has been a major ministry for Catholic women in religious institutes and the Catholic Church produced many of the world's first women professors.

Among the notable historical Catholic women teachers have been Trotula of Salerno the 11th-century physician, Dorotea Bucca who held a chair of medicine and philosophy at the University of Bologna from 1390, Elena Piscopia who, in 1678, became the first woman to receive a Doctorate of Philosophy, and Maria Agnesi, who was appointed around 1750 by Pope Benedict XIV as the first woman professor of mathematics.

The Englishwoman Mary Ward founded the Institute of the Blessed Virgin Mary (Loreto Sisters) in 1609, which has established schools throughout the world. Irishwoman Catherine McAuley founded the Sisters of Mercy in Dublin in 1831, at a time where access to education had been the preserve of Ireland's Protestant Ascendency. Her congregation went on to found schools and hospitals across the globe.

In 1872, the Salesian Sisters of Don Bosco (also called Daughters of Mary Help of Christians) was founded in Italy by Maria Domenica Mazzarello. The teaching order was to become the modern world's largest institute for women, with around 14,000 members in 2012.

In the United States, Saint Katharine Drexel inherited a fortune and established the Sisters of the Blessed Sacrament for Indians and Colored People(now known as the Sisters of the Blessed Sacrament), which founded schools across America and started Xavier University of Louisiana in New Orleans in 1925 for the education of African Americans.

=== In the Curia ===
The Curia is the governing body of the Roman Catholic Church, based in Rome, which has historically been entirely male.

In 2014, Sr. Luzia Premoli, superior general of the Combonian Missionary Sisters, was appointed a member of the Congregation for the Evangelization of Peoples, thus becoming the first woman to be appointed a member of a Vatican congregation (which is one of the higher ranking departments of the Roman Curia). Also in 2014, the first women were appointed to the Pontifical Biblical Commission.

On 24 May 2019, five women and one man were appointed consultor to the general secretariat of the Synod of Bishops in the Catholic Church. This was the first time women were appointed to this position.

On 8 July 2019, Pope Francis named Simona Brambilla and six others as the first women members of the Dicastery for Institutes of Consecrated Life and Societies of Apostolic Life.

On 15 January 2020, Pope Francis appointed Francesca Di Giovanni an Undersecretary for Multilateral Affairs in the Section for Relations with States of the Secretariat of State; this made her the first woman and the first lay person to hold a managerial position in the Secretariat of State, a position normally reserved for a member of the clergy.

In January 2021, Pope Francis issued the motu proprio “Spiritus Domini,” which changed canon 230 § 1 of the 1983 Code of Canon Law from "Lay men who possess the age and qualifications established by decree of the conference of bishops can be admitted on a stable basis through the prescribed liturgical rite to the ministries of lector and acolyte" to "Lay persons of suitable age and with the gifts determined by decree of the Episcopal Conference may be permanently assigned, by means of the established liturgical rite, to the ministries of lectors and acolytes." This meant women could begin to be admitted to the instituted ministries of acolyte and lector, which they could not before.

On 5 February 2021, Pope Francis appointed an Italian magistrate, Catia Summaria, as the first woman promoter of Justice in the Holy See's Court of Appeals. On 6 February 2021, he appointed Nathalie Becquart an undersecretary of the Synod of Bishops, making her the first woman to have the right to vote in the Synod of Bishops. On 9 March 2021, he chose Núria Calduch to be the Secretary of the Pontifical Biblical Commission, making her the first woman to reach this office.

On 24 March 2021, Pope Francis appointed Alessandra Smerilli the Undersecretary for the Faith and Development Sector of the Dicastery for Promoting Integral Human Development of the Roman Curia; she became, as interim, the first woman secretary of the dicastery on 26 August 2021. This made her the highest ranking woman in the curia at the time. On 23 April 2022 she became the Secretary for the Dicastery.

On 4 November 2021, Pope Francis appointed Raffaella Petrini Secretary General of the Governorate of Vatican City State, the first woman to hold that position.

On 13 July 2022, Pope Francis appointed women as members of the Dicastery for Bishops for the first time. He appointed two nuns and one laywoman - Raffaella Petrini, Yvonne Reungoat, and María Lía Zervino (Zervino being the laywoman).

On April 26, 2023, Pope Francis announced that women would be allowed to vote at the Sixteenth Ordinary General Assembly of the Synod of Bishops, marking the first time women were allowed to vote at any Catholic Synod of Bishops. Approximately 54 women voted.

On 7 October 2023, Pope Francis appointed Simona Brambilla as the first female secretary of the Dicastery for Institutes of Consecrated Life and Societies of Apostolic Life.

On 13 October 2023, Sister María de los Dolores Palencia Gómez led the Sixteenth Ordinary General Assembly of the Synod of Bishops, which made her the first woman to preside over any Catholic Synod of Bishops.

On December 13, 2024, Pope Francis named Simona Brambilla and María Lía Zervino along with two cardinals as his appointees to the 16th Ordinary Council of the General Secretariat of the Synod. Brambilla and Zervino were the first women appointed to that role. On 6 January 2025, Pope Francis named Brambilla Prefect of the Dicastery for Institutes of Consecrated Life and Societies of Apostolic Life. With this appointment, she became the first woman to head a department of the Roman Curia. Her term was suspended automatically with the death of Pope Francis, but was renewed provisionally by Pope Leo XIV.

Also in 2025, Pope Francis named Raffaella Petrini the first female president of both the Pontifical Commission for Vatican City State and the Governorate of Vatican City State, doing so on 15 February with an effective date of 1 March. Article 8 n. 1, of the Fundamental Law, promulgated in 2023, previously stated: “The Pontifical Commission is composed of Cardinals, including the President, and of other members, appointed by the Supreme Pontiff for a five-year term.” But in 2025, Pope Leo XIV replaced this with, “The Pontifical Commission for Vatican City State is composed of Cardinals and other members, including the President, appointed by the Supreme Pontiff for a five-year term”, thus allowing people who are not Cardinals, including women, to be President.

On 2 June 2026, Pope Leo XIV appointed Maria Montserrat Alvarado, President and COO of EWTN News, as Prefect of the Dicastery for Communication effective 1 November 2026. This made her the first woman to be the head of this dicastery, and the first non-religious woman appointed Prefect of any dicastery of the Holy See.

=== Altar servers ===
A circular letter from the Congregation for Divine Worship and the Discipline of the Sacraments to presidents of episcopal conferences on 15 March 1994 announced a 30 June 1992 authentic interpretation (confirmed on 11 July 1992 by Pope John Paul II) from the Pontifical Council for the Interpretation of Legislative Texts, and this authentic interpretation said that canon 230 § 2 states that service at the altar is one of the liturgical functions that can be performed by both lay men and women. The circular letter, written by the cardinal-prefect of the Congregation, also clarified that canon 230 § 2 has a permissive and not a prescriptive character; that is, it allows, but does not require, the use of female altar servers. Thus it is for each diocesan bishop to decide whether to allow them in his diocese.

A Catholic document from 2001 made clear that, even if a bishop decided to permit female altar servers, the priest in charge of a church in that diocese was not obliged to accept them, since there was no question of anyone, male or female, having a right to become an altar server. Furthermore, the document states that: "it will always be very appropriate to follow the noble tradition of having boys serve at the altar."

== Ordination of women ==
The Catholic Church doctrine on the ordination of women, as expressed in the current canon law and the Catechism of the Catholic Church, is that: "Only a baptized man (In Latin, vir) validly receives sacred ordination." Insofar as priestly and episcopal ordination are concerned, the Church teaches that this requirement is a matter of divine law, and thus doctrinal. The requirement that only males can receive ordination to the diaconate has not been promulgated as doctrinal by the Church's magisterium, though it is clearly at least a requirement according to canon law.

According to Phyllis Zagano, "While in modern times ordination has been restricted to men, this has not always been the case. Women were ordained deacons up until the fifth century in the West and up to the 11th century in the East."

According to Macy, the meaning of ordination during the Medieval Era was not what it is today. "Clergy came from and were assigned to a particular function within a particular community. Ordination in fact entailed and demanded appointment to a particular role in a particular church. Only in the twelfth century would ordination become an appointment for spiritual service not tied to any particular community."

Also according to Macy during that period, women and men held the same power within their own orders. "Women's orders appear along with the orders of men in many early medieval documents." Not only popes but also bishops included women among the ordained. Bishop Gilbert of Limerick included in his De usu ecclesiae (On the Practice of the Church) the injunction, ‘The bishop ordains abbots, abbesses, priests, and the six other grades.’ " One story written in the second half of the twelfth century describes the role of female clerics. A learned holy woman was in the Church reading from a book, the life of a virgin, in front of the altar to other women religious. A man came in and saw this going on. He stated, "She was a good cleric."

According to Macy In the tenth century, Bishop Atto of Vercelli wrote that due to the "shortage of workers, devout women were ordained to help men in leading the worship." "...Abbesses exercised functions that were later reserved to the male diaconate and presbyterate." When the power of the priests was established during the twelfth and thirteenth centuries, the word "ordination" took on a different meaning. "The central role of the priest as an administrator of the sacraments became essential to ordination only with its redefinition...abbots and abbesses in the earlier centuries preached, heard confessions, and baptized, all powers that would be reserved to the priest in the twelfth and thirteenth centuries." During this shift of roles in the Church, "the power to celebrate the Mass" was reserved for men.

However others argue against this "Though in former times there were several semi-clerical ranks of women in the Church (Deaconesses), they were not admitted to orders properly so called and had no spiritual power".

St. Joan's International Alliance, founded in 1911, was the first Catholic group to work for women being ordained as priests.

In front of a general audience in 2007, Pope Benedict XVI addressed the topic of the roles women have had during history in the Church. He stated, "The history of Christianity would have developed quite differently without the generous contribution of many women." This goes to show that influential people within the Church believe that women have contributed to the growth of the Church. Pope Benedict XVI said, "The women, unlike the Twelve, did not abandon Jesus at the hour of His Passion. Outstanding among them was Mary Magdalene ... who was the first witness of the Resurrection and announced it to the others" Mary Magdalene is one of the many women who were a significant figure. The Pope then "recalled how St. Thomas Aquinas referred to Mary Magdalene as ‘the apostle of the apostles.’ "

Feminists have disagreed with Church teachings on the ordination of women and have worked together with a coalition of American nuns to lead the Church to reconsider its position. They stated that many of the major Church documents were supposedly full of anti-female prejudice and a number of studies were conducted to discover how this alleged prejudice developed when it was deemed contrary to the openness of Jesus. These events led Pope John Paul II to issue the 1988 encyclical Mulieris Dignitatem (On the Dignity of Women), which declared that women had a different, yet equally important role in the Church.

The reservation of priestly ordination to men is listed by contemporary critics of the Catholic Church's treatment of women. Several Protestant religious traditions have authorized women ministers and preachers. Many churches in the Anglican Communion already permit women to serve at the altar. The 23 sui iuris Catholic Churches and the Eastern Orthodox are committed to an exclusively male priesthood, and these churches comprise three-fourths of all Christians in the world.

"The need for women deacons is present in the life of the ministry of the Church. Women already serve in diaconal positions in the parish; visiting the homebound and hospitalized, catechizing the youth, aiding the poor with programs that provide food and clothing, caring for the church building and arranging for liturgies." These roles are important, yes, but they fall below the roles in which men play within the Catholic Church.

A Catholic Youth Catechism states, "In male priests the Christian community was supposed to see a representation of Jesus Christ. Being a priest is a special service that also makes demands on a man in his gender-specific role as male and father." This catechism also states that it is not demeaning to women that only men receive the sacrament of Holy Orders. "As we see in Mary, women play a role in the Church that is no less central than the masculine role, but it is feminine."

In 1970 Ludmila Javorová attempted ordination as a Catholic priest in Czechoslovakia by a friend of her family, Bishop Felix Maria Davídek (1921–1988), himself clandestinely consecrated, due to the shortage of priests caused by communist persecution; however, an official Vatican statement in February 2000 declared the ordinations invalid while recognizing the severe circumstances under which they occurred.

In 1976, the Sacred Congregation for the Doctrine of the Faith discussed the issue of the ordination of women and issued a Declaration on the Question of the Admission of Women to the Ministerial Priesthood which concluded that for various doctrinal, theological, and historical reasons, the Church "... does not consider herself authorized to admit women to priestly ordination". The most important reasons stated were first, the Church's determination to remain faithful to its constant tradition, second, its fidelity to Christ's will, and third, the idea of male representation due to the "sacramental nature" of the priesthood. The Biblical Commission, an advisory commission that was to study the exclusion of women from the ministerial priesthood from a biblical perspective, had three opposing findings. They were, "that the New Testament does not settle in a clear way ... whether women can be ordained as priests, [that] scriptural grounds alone are not enough to exclude the possibility of ordaining women, [and that] Christ's plan would not be transgressed by permitting the ordination of women." In recent years, responding to questions about the matter, the Church has issued a number of documents repeating the same position.

In 1979 Nancy Ledins, born William Griglak, underwent gender reassignment surgery in Trinidad, Colorado. Ledins was previously ordained as a Catholic priest and was not returned to lay status, and is considered by some to be the first official woman priest in the Catholic Church. However, the Catechism of the Catholic Church does clearly state that gender is exclusively binary and every person should "acknowledge and accept his sexual identity." It strongly implies that birth anatomy and gender expression are equal.

In 1994, Pope John Paul II, declared the question closed in his letter Ordinatio sacerdotalis, stating: "Wherefore, in order that all doubt may be removed regarding a matter of great importance...I declare that the Church has no authority whatsoever to confer priestly ordination on women and that this judgment is to be definitively held by all the Church's faithful." This encyclical further explained that the Church follows the example of Jesus, who chose only men for the specific priestly duty.

Cardinal Ratzinger (Pope Benedict XVI) continued the church teaching regarding women's ordination as being "founded on the written Word of God, and from the beginning constantly preserved and applied in the Tradition of the Church, it has been set forth infallibly by the ordinary and universal Magisterium."

The Danube Seven (Christine Mayr-Lumetzberger, Adelinde Theresia Roitinger, Gisela Forster, Iris Muller, Ida Raming, Pia Brunner and Angela White), a group of seven women from Germany, Austria, and the United States, were ordained on a ship on the Danube on 29 June 2002 by Rómulo Antonio Braschi, an Independent Catholic bishop whose own episcopal ordination was considered 'valid but illicit' by the Catholic Church. The women's ordinations were not, however, recognised as being valid by the Roman Catholic Church. As a consequence of this violation of canon law and their refusal to repent, the women were excommunicated in 2003. Since then several similar actions have been held by Roman Catholic Womenpriests, a group in favor of women's ordination in Roman Catholicism; this was the first such action. In the summer of 2003, two of the Danube Seven, Christine Mayr-Lumetzberger (from Austria) and Gisela Forster (from Germany), were ordained as bishops by several male bishops of independent churches not affiliated with the Vatican. These ordinations were done in secret and are not recognized as valid by the Roman Catholic Church. At the death of the male bishops, their identities will be revealed. Since then several similar actions have been held by Roman Catholic Womenpriests; this was the first such action for women being ordained bishops. In 2004 Genevieve Benay (from France), Michele Birch-Conery (from Canada), Astride Indrican (from Latvia), Victoria Rue (from the US), Jane Via (from the US), and Monika Wyss (from Switzerland) were ordained as deacons on a ship in the Danube. The women's ordinations were not, however, recognised as being valid by the Roman Catholic Church. As a consequence of this violation of canon law and their refusal to repent, the women were excommunicated. Since then several similar actions have been held by Roman Catholic Womenpriests; this was the first such action for women being ordained deacons.

Presently, the Catholic Church has a shortage of priests in developed nations. To compensate, the Church has used "lay ecclesial roles". "Various forms of lay ministry in Catholicism have developed in the last quarter-century without any formal blueprint, but rather in response to the practical reality that parishes and dioceses could not catechize their new converts, run small faith groups, plan liturgies, and administer facilities if they had to rely exclusively upon priests to do so."

"We have in the United States 35,000 lay ecclesial ministers, of whom something like 80 or 85 percent are women." This is a significant percentage, and this number shows how many women do not hold a leadership position within the Catholic Church. There may be a possibility of women being ordained as deacons, but this may seem improbable because Canon Law prevents women from being ordained as anything. People tend to believe that if a person is ordained a deacon then they are on their way to priesthood, but this is not true. Deacons and priests are two completely different orders.

The argument for women being ordained as deacons is based on the fact that "the first deacons were called forth by apostles, not by Christ." The Church claims that Jesus called on his apostles and his apostles were male. Though according to this theory it does not apply to deacons. Also, again citing scripture, the only person who had the job title of "deacon" is Phoebe, a woman. Pope Francis rejected the possibility of women deacons in February 2020.

== Historical development ==
=== Early Christianity ===
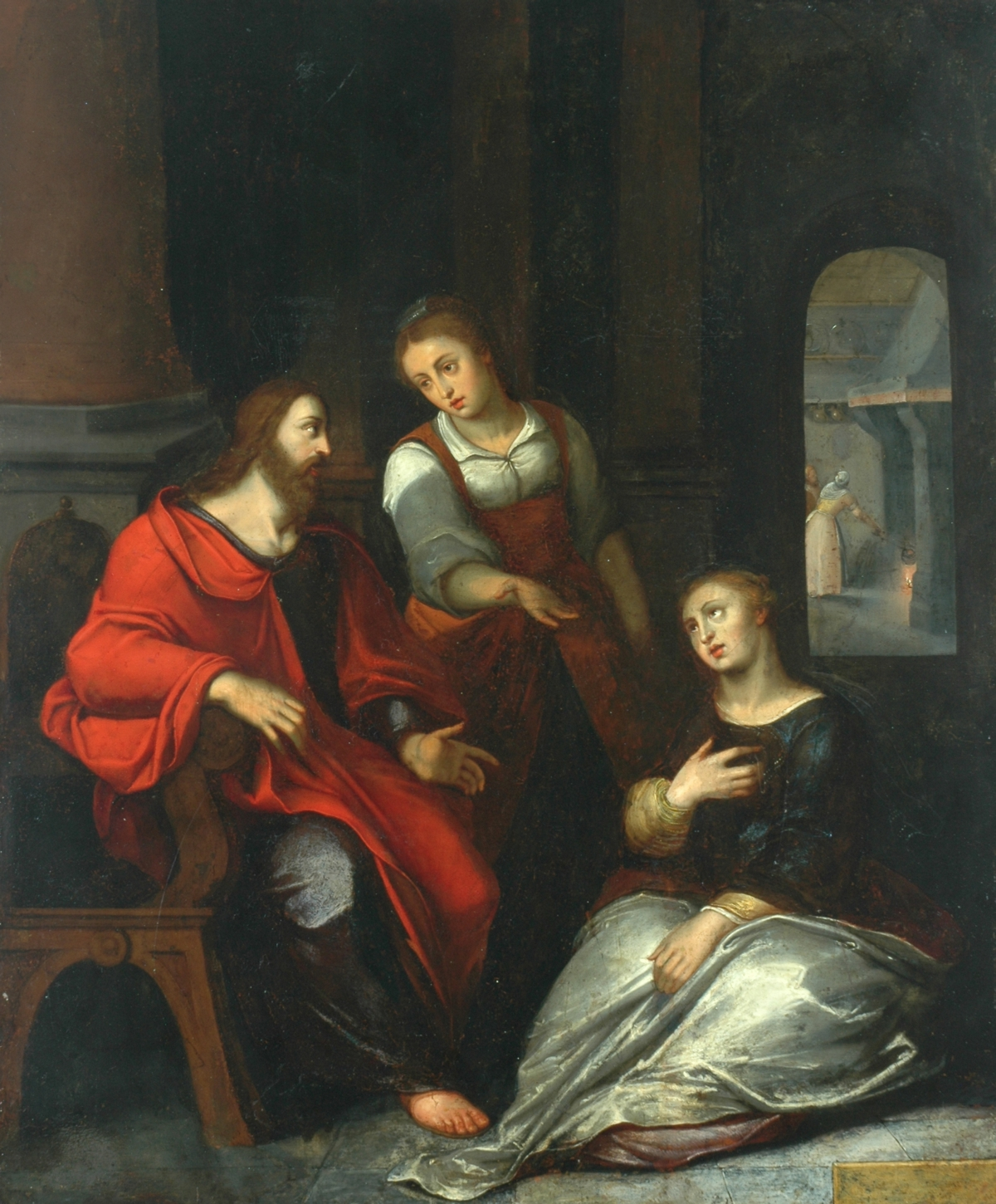
Christ in the House of Martha and Mary by Otto van Veen

According to historian Geoffrey Blainey, women were probably the majority of Christians in the 1st century after Christ. The 1st century Apostle Paul emphasised a faith open to all in his Letter to the Galatians: "There is neither Jew nor Greek, there is neither slave nor free, there is neither male nor female, for you are all one in Jesus Christ."

Other writings ascribed to Paul appear to both recognise women leadership in the early Church (Romans 16) and to put limits upon it (1 Timothy 2:12). According to the Book of Acts, the early church attracted significant numbers of women; many of these were prominent in cultures that afforded women more substantial roles than Judaism did and they shaped the church. According to Alister McGrath, Christianity had the effect of undermining traditional roles of both women and slaves by asserting that all were "one in Christ", regardless of whether they were Jew or Gentile, male or female, master or slave, and by asserting that all could share in Christian fellowship and worship together, again regardless of status.

McGrath describes Paul's egalitarian approach as "profoundly liberating" in that it implied new freedoms for women. McGrath comments that, although Christianity did not effect an immediate change in cultural attitudes towards women, the influence of Paul's egalitarianism was to "place a theoretical time bomb under them." He asserts that, ultimately, "the foundations of these traditional distinctions would be eroded to the point where they could no longer be maintained." Similarly, Suzanne Wemple notes that, although Christianity did not eliminate sexual discrimination in the late Roman Empire, it did offer women "the opportunity to regard themselves as independent personalities rather than as someone else's daughter, wife, or mother."

Women commemorated as saints from these early centuries include several martyrs who suffered under the Persecution of Christians in the Roman Empire, such as Agnes of Rome, Saint Cecilia, Agatha of Sicily and Blandina. Similarly, Saint Monica was a pious Christian and mother of Saint Augustine of Hippo who, after a wayward youth, converted to Christianity and became one of the most influential Christian theologians of all history.

While the Twelve Apostles were all male, and there is much debate about the beliefs of early church leaders such as St Paul, women were known to be very active in the early spread of Christianity.

=== Medieval era ===
As Western Europe transitioned from the Classical to the Medieval Age, the male hierarchy with the Pope as its summit became a central player in European politics. However, many women leaders also emerged at various levels within the Church. Mysticism flourished and monastic convents and communities of Catholic women became powerful institutions within Europe. Marian devotion blossomed, setting a model of mercy and maternal virtue at the heart of Western civilization.

Women religious played an important role in Catholicism through convents and abbeys, particularly in the establishment of schools, hospitals, nursing homes and monastic settlements, and through religious institutes of nuns or sisters such as the Benedictines, Dominicans, Sisters of St. Francis of Assisi, Loreto Sisters, Sisters of Mercy, Little Sisters of the Poor, Josephites, and Missionaries of Charity.

Petra Munro contrasts the early Christian Church as being inclusive of women as opposed to the medieval Church, which she describes as being "based on a gender hierarchy". The historian Geoffrey Blainey, however, writes that women were more prominent in the life of the Church during the Middle Ages than at any previous time in its history, and they initiated a number of church reforms. The Belgian nun, St Juliana of Liège (1193–1252), proposed the Feast of Corpus Christi, celebrating the body of Christ in the Eucharist, which became a major feast throughout the Church. In the 13th century, authors began to write of a mythical female pope – Pope Joan – who managed to disguise her gender until giving birth during a procession in Rome.

Blainey cites the ever-growing veneration of the Virgin Mary and Mary Magdalene as evidence of a high standing for female Christians at that time. The Virgin Mary was conferred such titles as Mother of God and Queen of Heaven and, in 863, her feast day, the "Feast of Our Lady", was declared equal in importance to those of Easter and Christmas. Mary Magdalene's Feast Day was celebrated in earnest from the 8th century and composite portraits of her were built up from Gospel references to other women Jesus met.

According to historian Shulamith Shahar, "some historians hold that the Church played a considerable part in fostering the inferior status of women in medieval society in general" by providing a moral justification for male superiority and by accepting practices such as wife-beating. Despite these laws, some women, particularly abbesses, gained powers that were never available to women in previous Roman or Germanic societies.

Although historians have argued that church teachings emboldened secular authorities to give women fewer rights than men, they also helped form the concept of chivalry. Chivalry was influenced by a new Church attitude towards Mary, the mother of Jesus. This "ambivalence about women's very nature" was shared by most major religions in the Western world. The development of Marian devotions and the image of the Virgin Mary as the "second Eve" also influenced the status of women during the Middle Ages. The increasing popularity of devotion to the Virgin Mary (the mother of Jesus) secured maternal virtue as a central cultural theme of Catholic Europe. Art historian Kenneth Clarke wrote that the 'Cult of the Virgin' in the early 12th century "had taught a race of tough and ruthless barbarians the virtues of tenderness and compassion."

Women who had been looked down upon as daughters of Eve, came to be regarded as objects of veneration and inspiration. The medieval development of chivalry, with the concept of the honor of a lady and the ensuing knightly devotion to it, was derived from Mariological thinking, and contributed to it. The medieval veneration of the Virgin Mary was contrasted to disregard for ordinary women, especially those outside aristocratic circles. At a time when women could be viewed as the source of evil, the concept of the Virgin Mary as mediator to God positioned her as a source of refuge for man, affecting the changing attitudes towards women.

=== 17th–19th centuries ===
Amidst the backdrop of Industrial Revolution and expanding European empires, a number of notable educational and nursing religious institutes were established by and for Catholic women during the 17th–19th centuries, and Catholic women played a central role in the developing or running of many the modern world's education and health care systems.

Rose of Lima, the first Catholic saint of the Americas, was born in Peru in 1586, and became known for her piety.

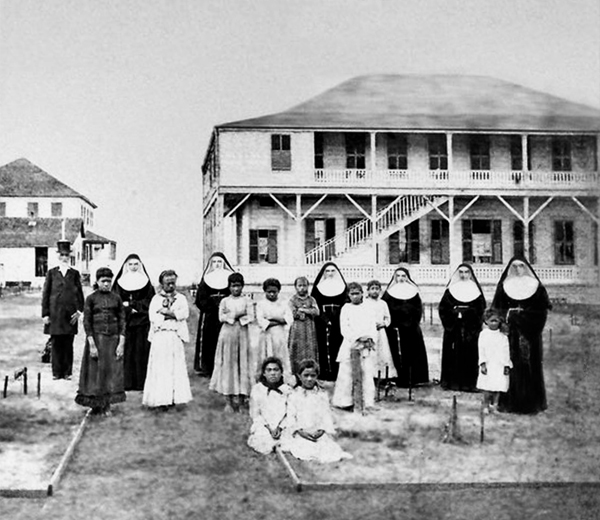
Catholic Sisters and leper children of Hawaii in 1886

=== 20th century ===
For much of the early 20th century, Catholic women continued to join religious institutes in large numbers, where their influence was particularly strong in the areas of education and healthcare.

Josephine Bakhita C. (ca. 1869–1947) was a Sudanese slave girl who became a Canossian nun; St. Katharine Drexel (1858–1955) worked for Native and African Americans; Polish mystic St Maria Faustina Kowalska (1905–1938) wrote her influential spiritual diary.

In 1903, Pope Pius X's Tra le sollecitudini controversially forbade women from singing in church choirs.

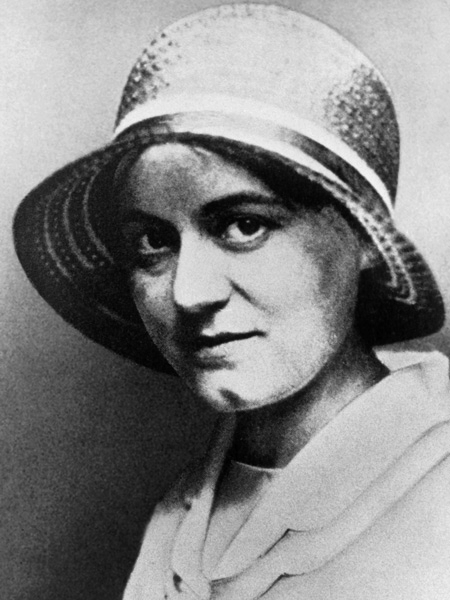
Edith Stein

German nun Edith Stein was murdered by the Nazis at Auschwitz. Catholic Poland suffered miserably under Nazi occupation, and a number of women are recognised for their heroism and martyrdom during the period: including eight religious sisters and several laywomen of Poland's 108 Martyrs of World War II and the eleven Sisters of the Holy Family of Nazareth murdered by the Gestapo in 1943 and known as the Blessed Martyrs of Nowogródek. Swedish born Elisabeth Hesselblad was listed among the "righteous among the nations" by Yad Vashem for her religious institute's work assisting Jews escape The Holocaust. She and two British women, Mother Riccarda Beauchamp Hambrough and Sister Katherine Flanagan, were beatified for reviving the Swedish Bridgettine Order of nuns and hiding scores of Jewish families in their convent during Rome's period of occupation under the Nazis.

Catholic lay women were involved in Catholic Arts and Letters in the 20th century, especially in English language literature. Sophie Treadwell was a Mexican-American Catholic laywoman who was both a journalist and a playwright in the first half of the 20th century. She wrote dozens of plays, several novels and serial stories, as well as countless newspaper articles. She gained international notoriety in 1921 when she secured an exclusive interview with Pancho Villa at his military outpost in northern Mexico. Treadwell often wrote about "the inequity experienced by 'ordinary' women in extraordinary situations." Upon her death the production rights and royalties to her plays were gifted to the Diocese of Tucson. Caryll Houselander was an English woman who wrote prolifically in the 1940s and early 1950s. Her spiritual reading and writing was centered mostly in the Gospels; so, her theology placed the meaning of human suffering within existence in the Mystical Body of Christ. American Flannery O'Connor also wrote in the middle of the 20th century from the 1940s to the 1960s. Calling herself a "Hillbilly Thomist", she expanded on St. Thomas Aquinas' thought that "grace perfects nature". With short stories and novels involving extreme violence her works alluded to God's Grace offered, but refused by humanity. Newspaperwoman turned social activist for life at all stages in all conditions, Dorothy Day, founded the Catholic Worker House system for homeless persons and immigrants, while writing numerous articles supporting the poor for the journal she published with the organization (The Catholic Worker), as well as for other news outlets well into the 1980s. Her theology showed an enhanced participation by lay people in the Church's mission.

US President Ronald Reagan presents Mother Teresa of Calcutta with the Presidential Medal of Freedom, 1985

In the developing world, people continued to convert to Catholicism in large numbers. Among the most famous women missionaries of the period was Mother Teresa of Calcutta, who was awarded the Nobel Peace Prize in 1979 for her work in "bringing help to suffering humanity". She was beatified in 2003.

In Western nations like the US, Catholic women continued to be heavily involved in areas like health and education. The Second Vatican Council of the 1960s liberalized the strictures of Catholic religious life; however, in the latter half of the 20th century, vocations for women in the West entered a steep decline. This was accompanied by the 20th century's women's movement, sexual revolution, ethnic assimilation and the Council's opening of the church to lay leadership.

Many Catholic women and religious are prominent advocates in social policy debates—as with American sister Helen Prejean, a Sister of Saint Joseph of Medaille, who is a prominent campaigner against the death penalty and was the inspiration for the Hollywood film Dead Man Walking.

The 1983 Code of Canon Law replaced the 1917 code in its entirety and contains no head-covering requirement for women; where the custom persists, it is by local practice rather than universal law.

Social attitudes to sex and marriage in the West moved away from traditional Catholic teachings and Western governments also liberalized laws relating to abortion. In the face of the HIV AIDS epidemic that emerged in the 1980s, Catholic women became heavily involved in establishing hospices to care for AIDS patients, as with the Sisters of Charity who established Australia's first AIDS clinic at St Vincent's Hospital, Sydney.

=== 21st century ===
In 2014 Angeline Franciscan Sister Mary Melone was appointed as the first female rector of a pontifical university in Rome; specifically, the Pontifical University Antonianum.

In 2016 it was announced that the Roman Missal had been revised to permit women to have their feet washed on Holy Thursday; previously it permitted only males to do so.

In 2026 the Pope appointed Mary Barron, an Irish nun, as the first female president of the Pontifical Mission Societies beginning in January 2027.

=== Current status ===
According to Catherine Wessinger, Catholic lay women have been increasingly called to play important roles in the Catholic Church; this trend is particularly strong in the United States.

Cynthia Stewart asserts that, although the hierarchy of the Church is entirely male as a result of the inability to ordain women, the majority of Catholics that participate in lay ministry are women. According to Stewart, approximately 85 percent of all Church roles that do not require ordination are performed by women. Stewart identifies several reasons for the increased role that lay women play in the Catholic Church:

1. a shift in cultural attitudes leading to greater acceptance of women in leadership roles
2. an increase in outreach ministries targeted at groups with whom women have traditionally worked (e.g. elderly and children)
3. a greater willingness on the part of women to accept lower salaries than those offered by the secular world.

The importance of women to the "life and mission of the Church" was emphasized by Pope John Paul II who wrote:

"The presence and the role of women in the life and mission of the Church, although not linked to the ministerial priesthood, remain absolutely necessary and irreplaceable. As the Declaration Inter Insigniores points out, 'The Church desires that Christian women should become fully aware of the greatness of their mission: today their role is of capital importance both for the renewal and humanization of society and for the rediscovery by believers of the true face of the Church' " ( No. 10).

New feminism is a Catholic philosophy which emphasizes a belief in an integral complementarity of men and women, rather than the superiority of men over women or women over men. New feminism, as a form of difference feminism, supports the idea that men and women have different strengths, perspectives, and roles, while advocating for the equal worth and dignity of both sexes. Among its basic concepts are that the most important differences are those that are biological rather than cultural. New feminism holds that women should be valued as child bearers, home makers, and as individuals with equal worth to men.

== See also ==
- Ordination of women and the Catholic Church
- Sex and gender roles in the Catholic Church
- Theology of the Body

== Sources ==
- Bitel, Lisa (2002), Women in early medieval Europe, 400-1100, Cambridge University Press, ISBN 0-521-59207-0
- Bokenkotter, Thomas (2004), A Concise History of the Catholic Church, Doubleday, ISBN 0-385-50584-1
- Chadwick, Henry (1990), "The Early Christian Community", in John McManners (ed.), The Oxford Illustrated History of Christianity, Oxford University Press, ISBN 0-19-822928-3
- McGuiness, Margaret (2015), Called to Serve: A History of Nuns in America, NYU Press, ISBN 978-0-8147-9557-6
- Power, Eileen (1995), Postand, Michael Moissey (ed.), Medieval Women, Cambridge University Press, ISBN 0-521-59556-8
- Shahar, Shulamith (2003), The Fourth Estate: A History of Women in the Middle Ages, New York: Routledge
- Witte, John (1997), From Sacrament to Contract: Marriage, Religion, and Law in the Western Tradition, Louisville, KY: Westminster John Knox Press, ISBN 978-0-664-25543-5
