= Timeline of women in religion in the United States =

== Before 1776 ==
- 1636 to 1643: Though she predates the start of the United States by over 100 years, Anne Hutchinson was highly influential on later American Colonial values with respect to civil liberty and religious freedoms.
- Circa 1770: Mary Evans Thorne was appointed class leader by Joseph Pilmore in Philadelphia, making her probably the first woman in America to be so appointed.
- 1774: Ann Lee and her followers arrive in New York City.
- 1775: Ann Lee and her followers establish the first communal home of the United Society of Believers in Christ's Second Appearance (aka the Shakers) seven miles West of Albany, NY.

== 19th century ==
- Early 19th century: In the United States, in contrast with almost every other organized denomination, the Society of Friends (Quakers) has allowed women to serve as ministers since the early 19th century.
- 1815: Clarissa Danforth was ordained in New England. She was the first woman ordained by the Free Will Baptist denomination.
- 1830: In Harmony, PA, Emma Hale Smith was promised that she would be ordained "to expound scriptures, and to exhort the church, according as it shall be given thee by my Spirit" (Doctrine and Covenants, 25:7).
- 1844: Elizabeth Peabody became the first person to translate any Buddhist scripture into English, translating a chapter of the Lotus Sutra from its French translation.
- 1853: Antoinette Brown Blackwell was the first woman ordained as a minister in the United States. She was ordained by a church belonging to the Congregationalist Church. However, her ordination was not recognized by the denomination. She later quit the church and became a Unitarian. The Congregationalists later merged with others to create the United Church of Christ, which ordains women.
- 1861: Mary A. Will was the first woman ordained in the Wesleyan Methodist Connection by the Illinois Conference in the United States. The Wesleyan Methodist Connection eventually became the Wesleyan Church.
- 1863:
  - The Seventh-day Adventist Church was founded in Michigan; one of its founders was a woman, Ellen G. White.
  - American Olympia Brown was ordained by the Universalist denomination in 1863, the first woman ordained by that denomination, in spite of a last-moment case of cold feet by her seminary which feared adverse publicity.
- 1866: Helenor M. Davison was ordained as a deacon by the North Indiana Conference of the Methodist Protestant Church, probably making her the first ordained woman in the Methodist tradition.
- 1866: American Margaret Newton Van Cott became the first woman to be licensed to preach in The Methodist Episcopal Church.
- 1869:
  - American Margaret Newton Van Cott became the first woman in the Methodist Episcopal Church to receive a local preacher's license.
  - Lydia Sexton (of the United Brethren Church) was appointed chaplain of the Kansas State Prison at the age of 70, the first woman in the United States to hold such a position.
- 1876:
  - Anna Oliver became the first woman to graduate from a Methodist seminary, receiving a Bachelor of Divinity from Boston University School of Theology.
  - American Julia Evelina Smith's 1876 Bible translation, titled The Holy Bible: Containing the Old and New Testaments; Translated Literally from the Original Tongues, is considered the first complete translation of the Bible into English by a woman.
- 1879: The Church of Christ, Scientist was founded in New England by an American woman, Mary Baker Eddy.
- 1880: Anna Howard Shaw was the first woman ordained in the Methodist Protestant Church, an American church which later merged with other denominations to form the United Methodist Church.
- 1884: Julie Rosewald, called "Cantor Soprano" by her congregation, became America's first female cantor, serving San Francisco's Temple Emanu-El from 1884 until 1893, although she was not ordained. She was born in Germany.
- 1889:
  - The Nolin Presbytery of the Cumberland Presbyterian Church ordained Louisa Woosley as the first female minister of the Cumberland Presbyterian Church, USA.
  - Ella Niswonger was the first woman ordained in the American United Brethren Church, which later merged with other denominations to form the American United Methodist Church, which has ordained women with full clergy rights and conference membership since 1956.
- 1890: On September 14, 1890, Ray Frank gave the Rosh Hashana sermon for a community in Spokane, Washington, thus becoming the first woman to preach from a synagogue pulpit, although she was not a rabbi.

== Early 20th century ==
- 1907: Anna Alexander of the Episcopal Diocese of Georgia became the first (and only ever) African-American deaconess in the Episcopal Church.
- 1909:
  - The Church of God (Cleveland, Tennessee) began ordaining women in 1909.
  - Women were first elected to the procurer of the Bahá'í Local Spiritual Assembly of Chicago – the Bahai Temple Unity. Of the nine members elected by secret ballot three were women with Corinne True (later appointed as a Hand of the Cause) serving as an officer.
- 1911: Ann Allebach was the first Mennonite woman to be ordained. This occurred at the First Mennonite Church of Philadelphia.
- 1912: Olive Winchester, born in America, became the first woman ordained by any trinitarian Christian denomination in the United Kingdom when she was ordained by the Church of the Nazarene.
- 1917:
- 1918: Alma Bridwell White, head of the Pillar of Fire Church, became the first woman ordained as a bishop in the United States.
- 1921: Helen Barrett Montgomery became the first woman to be elected president of the Northern Baptist Convention (NBC), and of any religious denomination in the United States.
- 1922:
  - The Jewish Reform movement's Central Conference of American Rabbis stated that "...woman cannot justly be denied the privilege of ordination." However, the first woman in Reform Judaism to be ordained (Sally Priesand) was not ordained until 1972.
  - The American rabbi Mordecai M. Kaplan held the first public celebration of a bat mitzvah in the United States, for his daughter Judith, on March 18, 1922, at the Society for the Advancement of Judaism, his synagogue in New York City. Judith Kaplan recited the preliminary blessing, read a portion of that week's Torah portion in Hebrew and English, and then intoned the closing blessing. Kaplan, who at that time claimed to be an Orthodox rabbi, joined Conservative Judaism and then became the founder of Reconstructionist Judaism, influenced Jews from all branches of non-Orthodox Judaism, through his position at the Jewish Theological Seminary of America. At the time, most Orthodox rabbis strongly rejected the idea of a bat mitzvah ceremony.
  - The Presbyterian General Assembly of the Presbyterian Church in the United States of America allowed women to be deaconesses.
- 1924: Ida B. Robinson founded the Mount Sinai Holy Church of America and became the organization's first presiding bishop and president.
- 1930: The Presbyterian Church in the United States of America ordained its first woman elder, Sarah E. Dickson.
- 1936: Sunya Gladys Pratt was ordained as a Buddhist minister in the Shin Buddhist tradition in Tacoma, Washington.
- 1938: Tehilla Lichtenstein became the first Jewish American woman to serve as the spiritual leader of an ongoing Jewish congregation, although she was not ordained.
- 1949: The Old Catholic Church (in the U.S.) started to ordain women.

== Late 20th century ==
=== 1950s ===
- 1950: In August 1950, amidst the success of Dianetics, Hubbard held a demonstration in Los Angeles' Shrine Auditorium where he presented a young woman called Sonya Bianca (a pseudonym) to a large audience including many reporters and photographers as "the world's first Clear." However, despite Hubbard's claim that she had "full and perfect recall of every moment of her life", Bianca proved unable to answer questions from the audience testing her memory and analytical abilities, including the question of the color of Hubbard's tie. Hubbard explained Bianca's failure to display her promised powers of recall to the audience by saying that he had used the word "now" in calling her to the stage, and thus inadvertently froze her in "present time," which blocked her abilities. Later, in the late 1950s, Hubbard would claim that several people had reached the state of Clear by the time he presented Bianca as the world's first; these others, Hubbard said, he had successfully cleared in the late 1940s while working incognito in Hollywood posing as a swami. In 1966, Hubbard declared South African Scientologist John McMaster to be the first true Clear. McMaster left the Sea Org in November 1969, expressing continuing belief in the Scientology techniques, but disapproval of the way Scientology was managed.
- 1951: From 1951 until 1953, Paula Ackerman served as Temple Beth Israel's spiritual leader. In so doing, she achieved the distinction of becoming the first woman to assume spiritual leadership of a mainstream American Jewish congregation, although she was never ordained.
- 1956:
  - Maud K. Jensen was the first woman to receive full clergy rights and conference membership (in her case, in the Central Pennsylvania Conference) in the Methodist Church.
  - The Presbyterian Church in the United States of America ordained its first female minister, Margaret Towner.

=== 1960s ===
- 1964: American Addie Elizabeth Davis became the first Southern Baptist woman to be ordained. However, the Southern Baptist Convention stopped ordaining women in 2000, although existing female pastors are allowed to continue their jobs.
- 1965: Rachel Henderlite became the first woman ordained in the Presbyterian Church in the United States; she was ordained by the Hanover Presbytery in Virginia.
- 1967: Margaret Henrichsen became the first American female district superintendent in the Methodist Church.

=== 1970s ===
- 1970: On November 22, 1970, Elizabeth Alvina Platz became the first woman ordained by the Lutheran Church in America, and as such was the first woman ordained by any Lutheran denomination in America. The first woman ordained by the American Lutheran Church, Barbara Andrews, was ordained in December 1970. On January 1, 1988 the Lutheran Church in America, the American Lutheran Church, and the Association of Evangelical Lutheran Churches merged to form the Evangelical Lutheran Church in America, which continues to ordain women. (The first woman ordained by the Association of Evangelical Lutheran Churches, Janith Otte, was ordained in 1977.)
- 1972: Sally Priesand became America's first female rabbi ordained by a rabbinical seminary, and the second formally ordained female rabbi in Jewish history, after Regina Jonas.
- 1973: Emma Sommers Richards became the first Mennonite woman to be ordained as a pastor of a Mennonite congregation (Lombard Mennonite Church in Illinois).
- 1974:
  - Katie Cannon was ordained on April 24, 1974, in Shelby, North Carolina, by the Catawba Presbytery, in the Synod of Catawba, becoming the first African-American woman to be ordained in the United Presbyterian Church (U.S.A.).
  - On July 29, 1974, Bishops Daniel Corrigan, Robert L. DeWitt, and Edward R. Welles of the Episcopal Church of the U.S., with Bishop Antonio Ramos of Costa Rica, ordained eleven women as priests in a ceremony that was widely considered "irregular" because the women lacked "recommendation from the standing committee," a canonical prerequisite for ordination. The "Philadelphia Eleven", as they became known, were Merrill Bittner, Alison Cheek, Alla Bozarth (Campell), Emily C. Hewitt, Carter Heyward, Suzanne R. Hiatt, Marie Moorefield, Jeannette Piccard, Betty Bone Schiess, Katrina Welles Swanson, and Nancy Hatch Wittig.
  - Sandy Eisenberg Sasso became the first female Reconstructionist rabbi when she was ordained by the American Reconstructionist Rabbinical College in 1974.
- 1975
  - George W. Barrett, a bishop of the Episcopal Church of the U.S., ordained four women in an irregular ceremony in Washington, D.C.; these women are known as the Washington Four.
  - American Barbara Ostfeld-Horowitz became the first ordained female cantor in Jewish history.
- 1976:
  - Michal Mendelsohn (born Michal Bernstein) became the first presiding female rabbi in a North American congregation when she was hired by Temple Beth El Shalom in San Jose, California, in 1976.
  - Karuna Dharma became the first fully ordained female member of the Buddhist monastic community in the U.S.
- 1978:
  - Bonnie Koppell became the first female rabbi to serve in the U.S. military.
  - Linda Rich became the first female cantor to sing in a Conservative synagogue, specifically Temple Beth Zion in Los Angeles, although she was not ordained.
  - Lauma Lagzdins Zusevics was ordained as the first woman to serve as a full-time minister for the Latvian Evangelical Lutheran Church in America.
  - American Mindy Jacobsen became the first blind woman to be ordained as a hazzan (also called a cantor) in the history of Judaism; she was ordained in 1978 by Hebrew Union College.
- 1979:
  - The Reformed Church in America started ordaining women as ministers. Women had been admitted to the offices of deacon and elder in 1972.
  - Linda Joy Holtzman became one of the first women in the United States to serve as the presiding rabbi of a synagogue, when she was hired by Beth Israel Congregation of Chester County, which was then located in Coatesville, Pennsylvania. She had graduated in 1979 from the Reconstructionist Rabbinical College in Philadelphia, yet was hired by Beth Israel despite their being a Conservative congregation. She was thus the first woman to serve as a rabbi for a Conservative congregation, as the Conservative movement did not then ordain women.
  - Earlean Miller became the first African-American woman ordained in the Lutheran Church in America (LCA), the largest of three denominations that later combined to form the Evangelical Lutheran Church in America.
  - Drisha was founded in 1979 in New York by Rabbi David Silber as the world's first center dedicated specifically to women's study of classical Jewish texts.
  - In 1979 Nancy Ledins, born William Griglak, underwent gender reassignment surgery in Trinidad, Colorado. Ledins was previously ordained as a Catholic priest and was not returned to lay status, and is considered by some to be the first official woman priest in the Catholic Church. However, the Catechism of the Catholic Church does clearly state that gender is exclusively binary and every person should "acknowledge and accept his sexual identity." It strongly implies that birth anatomy and gender expression are equal.

=== 1980s ===
- 1981:
  - American Lynn Gottlieb became the first woman ordained as a rabbi in the Jewish Renewal movement; she was ordained by rabbis Zalman Schachter, Everett Gendler, and Shlomo Carlebach. She authored She Who Dwells Within: A Feminist Vision of a Renewed Judaism (1995).
  - Kinneret Shiryon, born in the United States, became the first female rabbi in Israel.
  - Ani Pema Chodron is an American woman who was ordained as a bhikkhuni (a fully ordained Buddhist nun) in a lineage of Tibetan Buddhism in 1981. Pema Chödrön was the first American woman to be ordained as a Buddhist nun in the Tibetan Buddhist tradition.
  - Karen Soria, born and ordained in the United States, became Australia's first female rabbi.
- 1984:
  - Leontine Kelly, the first black woman to become a bishop of a major religious denomination in the United States, was elected head of the United Methodist Church in the San Francisco area.
  - From 1984 to 1990 Barbara Borts, born in America, was a rabbi at Radlett Reform Synagogue, making her the first woman rabbi to have a pulpit of her own in a UK Reform Judaism synagogue.
- 1985:
  - Judy Harrow became the first member of CoG (Covenant of the Goddess, a Wiccan group) to be legally registered as clergy in New York City in 1985, after a five-year effort requiring the assistance of the New York Civil Liberties Union.
  - Amy Eilberg became the first female rabbi ordained in Conservative Judaism when she was ordained in 1985 by the Jewish Theological Seminary of America.
  - 1986: Rabbi Julie Schwartz became the first female Naval chaplain in the U.S.
- 1987: Erica Lippitz and Marla Rosenfeld Barugel became the first two female hazzans (also called cantors) ordained in Conservative Judaism; they were ordained at the same time by the Cantors Institute of the Jewish Theological Seminary in New York City.
- 1988: Jetsunma Ahkon Lhamo, an American woman formerly called Catharine Burroughs, became the first Western woman to be named a reincarnate lama.
- 1989: Einat Ramon, ordained in New York, became the first female native-Israeli rabbi.

=== 1990s ===
- 1990: Sister Cora Billings was installed as a pastor in Richmond, VA, becoming the first black nun to head a parish in the U.S.
- 1992:
  - Naamah Kelman, born in the United States, became the first female rabbi ordained in Israel.
  - Rabbi Karen Soria became the first female rabbi to serve in the U.S. Marines, which she did from 1992 until 1996.
- 1993:
  - Rebecca Dubowe became the first deaf woman to be ordained as a rabbi in the United States.
  - Chana Timoner became the first female rabbi to hold an active duty assignment as a chaplain in the U.S. Army.
  - Leslie Friedlander became the first female cantor ordained by the Academy for Jewish Religion (New York).
  - Ariel Stone, also called C. Ariel Stone, became the first American Reform rabbi to lead a congregation in the former Soviet Union, and the first liberal rabbi in Ukraine. She worked as a rabbi in Ukraine from 1993 until 1994, leaving her former job at the Temple of Israel in Miami.
- 1994:
  - Lia Bass was ordained by the Jewish Theological Seminary in New York, thus becoming the first Latin-American female rabbi in the world as well as the first woman from Brazil to be ordained as a rabbi.
  - Rabbi Laura Geller became the first woman to lead a major metropolitan congregation, specifically Temple Emanuel in Beverly Hills.
  - Amina Wadud, born in the United States, became the first woman in South Africa to deliver the jum'ah khutbah, at the Claremont Main Road Mosque in Cape Town.
- 1995: The Sligo Seventh-day Adventist Church in Takoma Park, Maryland, ordained three women in violation of the denomination's rules – Kendra Haloviak, Norma Osborn, and Penny Shell.
- 1996: Chava Koster, born in the Netherlands and ordained in the United States, became the first female rabbi from the Netherlands.
- 1998:
  - On July 28, 1998, Ava Muhammad became the first female minister in the Nation of Islam, heading Muhammad's Mosque 15 in Atlanta, Ga., one of the largest mosques in the country. In addition to administering day-to-day affairs there she was named Southern Regional Minister, giving her jurisdiction over Nation of Islam mosque activity in Georgia, Alabama, Mississippi, and parts of Tennessee.
  - Some Orthodox Jewish congregations started to employ women as congregational interns, a job created for learned Orthodox Jewish women. Although these interns do not lead worship services, they perform some tasks usually reserved for rabbis, such as preaching, teaching, and consulting on Jewish legal matters. The first woman hired as a congregational intern was Julie Stern Joseph, hired in 1998 by the Lincoln Square Synagogue of the Upper West Side.
  - Sherry Chayat, born in Brooklyn, became the first American woman to receive transmission in the Rinzai school of Buddhism.
- 1999:
  - The First Satanic Church was founded by Karla LaVey in 1999 in San Francisco, California.
  - Beth Lockard was ordained as the first deaf pastor in the Evangelical Lutheran Church in America.
  - Angela Warnick Buchdahl, born in Seoul, Korea, became the first Asian-American person to be ordained as a cantor in the world when she was ordained by HUC-JIR, an American seminary for Reform Judaism.

== 21st century ==
=== 2000s ===
- 2000: Helga Newmark, born in Germany, became the first female Holocaust survivor ordained as a rabbi. She was ordained in America.
- 2001: Angela Warnick Buchdahl, born in Seoul, Korea, became the first Asian-American person to be ordained as a rabbi in the world; she was ordained by HUC-JIR, an American seminary for Reform Judaism.

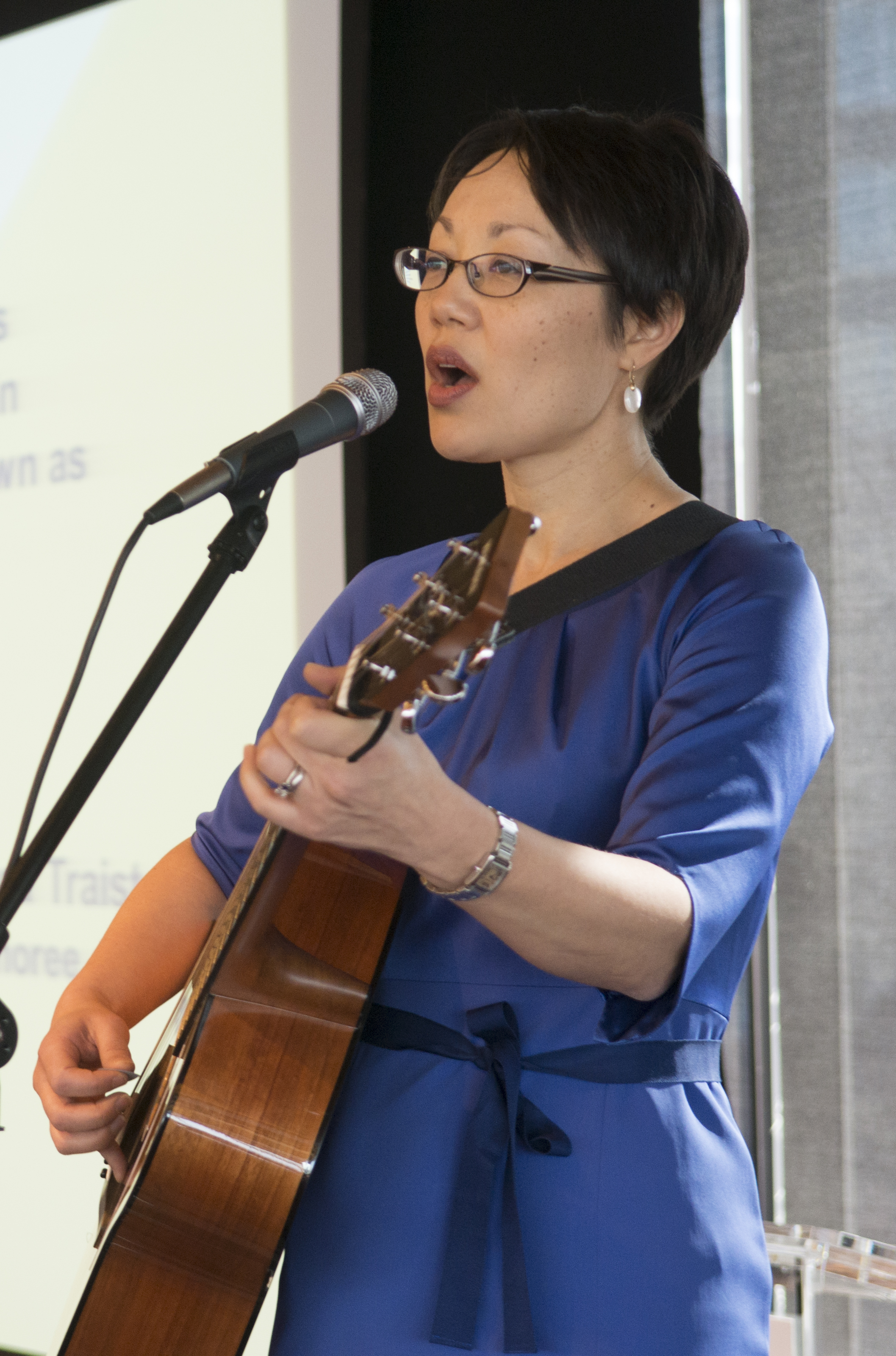
Rabbi Angela Warnick Buchdahl

- 2002:
  - American Sharon Hordes was ordained as Reconstructionist Judaism's first cantor in 2002.
  - Suzan Johnson Cook became the first woman elected president of the Hampton University Ministers' Conference, a conference which represents all of the historically African-American denominations.
  - The Danube Seven (Christine Mayr-Lumetzberger, Adelinde Theresia Roitinger, Gisela Forster, Iris Muller, Ida Raming, Pia Brunner and Angela White), a group of seven women from Germany, Austria, and the United States, were ordained on a ship on the Danube on 29 June 2002 by Rómulo Antonio Braschi, an Independent Catholic bishop whose own episcopal ordination was considered 'valid but illicit' by the Roman Catholic Church. The women's ordinations were not, however, recognised as being valid by the Roman Catholic Church. As a consequence of this violation of canon law and their refusal to repent, the women were excommunicated in 2003. Since then several similar actions have been held by Roman Catholic Womenpriests, a group in favor of women's ordination in Roman Catholicism; this was the first such action.
  - Khenmo Drolma, an American woman, became the first bhikkhuni (fully ordained Buddhist nun) in the Drikung Kagyu lineage of Buddhism, traveling to Taiwan to be ordained.
  - Jacqueline Mates-Muchin was ordained by Hebrew Union College-Jewish Institute of Religion in New York, and thus became the first Chinese-American rabbi.
  - Marie Jerge became bishop in Evangelical Lutheran Church in America
- 2003:
  - Ayya Sudhamma Bhikkhuni became the first American-born woman to gain bhikkhuni ordination in the Theravada school in Sri Lanka.
  - Sarah Schechter became the first female rabbi in the U.S. Air Force.
  - Rabbi Janet Marder was named the first female president of the Reform Movement's Central Conference of American Rabbis (CCAR) on March 26, 2003, making her the first woman to lead a major rabbinical organization and the first woman to lead any major Jewish co-ed religious organization in the United States.
- 2004:
  - Khenmo Drolma, an American woman, became the first westerner of either sex to be installed as an abbot in the Drikung Kagyu lineage of Buddhism, being installed as the abbot of the Vajra Dakini Nunnery in Vermont (America's first Tibetan Buddhist nunnery) in 2004.
  - Barbara Aiello, born and ordained in the United States, became the first female rabbi in Italy.
  - Genevieve Benay (from France), Michele Birch-Conery (from Canada), Astride Indrican (from Latvia), Victoria Rue (from the USA), Jane Via (from the USA), and Monika Wyss (from Switzerland) were ordained as deacons on a ship in the Danube. The women's ordinations were not, however, recognised as being valid by the Roman Catholic Church. As a consequence of this violation of canon law and their refusal to repent, the women were excommunicated. Since then several similar actions have been held by Roman Catholic Womenpriests, a group in favor of women's ordination in Roman Catholicism; this was the first such action for female deacons.
  - The Lutheran Church – Missouri Synod (LCMS) in 2004 affirmed that women can hold any congregational office that does not involve pastoral functions.
- 2005: The Lutheran Evangelical Protestant Church, (LEPC) (GCEPC) in the USA elected Nancy Kinard Drew as its first female Presiding Bishop.
- 2006:
  - Susan Wehle became the first American female cantor in Jewish Renewal in 2006; however, she died in 2009.
  - Merle Kodo Boyd, born in Texas, became the first African-American woman ever to receive Dharma transmission in Zen Buddhism.
  - American woman Tamara Kolton became the first person ordained as a member of the Humanistic Jewish movement.
  - Dina Najman became the first Orthodox woman appointed as rabbinic leader of a synagogue, when she became the Rosh Kehilah of Kehilat Orach Eliezer in Manhattan, New York.
- 2007: Laleh Bakhtiar's translation of the Qur'an, first published in 2007 and called The Sublime Quran, was the first translation of the Qur'an by an American woman.
- 2008:
  - On 17 October 2008, Amina Wadud, born in the United States, became the first woman to lead a mixed-gender congregation in prayer in the United Kingdom when she performed the Friday prayers at Oxford's Wolfson College.
  - After a 10-year process of advanced training culminating in a ceremony called shitsugo (literally "room-name"), Sherry Chayat received the title of roshi and the name Shinge ("Heart/Mind Flowering") from Eido Roshi, which was the first time that this ceremony was held in the United States.
- 2009:
  - Alysa Stanton, born in Cleveland and ordained by a Reform Jewish seminary in Cincinnati, became the world's first black female rabbi.
  - Tannoz Bahremand Foruzanfar, who was born in Iran, became the first Persian woman to be ordained as a cantor in the United States.
  - On July 19, 2009, 11 women received semicha (ordination) as kohanot from the Kohenet Hebrew Priestess Institute, based at the Isabella Freedman Jewish Retreat Center in Connecticut, becoming their first priestess ordainees.

=== 2010s ===
- 2010:
  - Sara Hurwitz, an American Orthodox Jewish woman born in South Africa, was given the title of "rabbah" (sometimes spelled "rabba"), the feminine form of rabbi. As such, she is considered by some to be the first female Orthodox rabbi.
  - The Soto Zen Buddhist Association (SZBA) approved a document honoring the women ancestors in the Zen tradition at its biannual meeting on October 8, 2010. Female ancestors, dating back 2,500 years from India, China, and Japan, could thus be included in the curriculum, ritual, and training offered to Western Zen students.
  - The first American women to be ordained as cantors in Jewish Renewal after Susan Wehle's ordination were Michal Rubin and Abbe Lyons, both ordained on January 10, 2010.
  - In 2010, at the Orthodox Jewish synagogue Hebrew Institute of Riverdale, Lamelle Ryman led a Friday-night service as a cantor would. No other Orthodox synagogue in the U.S. had ever before had a woman lead a Kabbalat Shabbat service, although Orthodox institutions like the Darkhei Noam prayer group in New York and the Shira Hadasha congregation in Jerusalem already did have women leading Kabbalat Shabbat. In addition, there had been a female-led Kabbalat Shabbat in a Washington Heights apartment in Manhattan — most of the worshippers came from the Yeshiva University community — in 1987 that drew little attention or opposition. In any case, Lamelle Ryan was not ordained as a cantor, and as of 2010 Orthodox Judaism does not ordain women as cantors.
  - The first Sefer Torah scribed by a group of women (six female sofers, who were from Brazil, Canada, Israel, and the United States) was completed; this was known as the Women's Torah Project.
  - The first Tibetan Buddhist nunnery in America (Vajra Dakini Nunnery in Vermont), offering novice ordination in the Drikung Kagyu lineage of Buddhism, was officially consecrated.
  - In Northern California, 4 novice nuns were given the full bhikkhuni ordination in the Thai Therevada tradition, which included the double ordination ceremony. Bhante Gunaratana and other monks and nuns were in attendance. It was the first such ordination ever in the Western hemisphere. The following month, more full ordinations were completed in Southern California, led by Walpola Piyananda and other monks and nuns. The bhikkhunis ordained in Southern California were Lakshapathiye Samadhi (born in Sri Lanka), Cariyapanna, Susila, Sammasati (all three born in Vietnam), and Uttamanyana (born in Myanmar).
  - With the October 16, 2010, ordination of Margaret Lee, in the Peoria-based Diocese of Quincy, Illinois, women have been ordained as priests in all 110 dioceses of the Episcopal Church in the United States.
- 2011:
  - From October 2010 until spring 2011, Julie Seltzer, one of the female sofers from the Women's Torah Project (see above in 2010), scribed a Sefer Torah as part of an exhibition at the Contemporary Jewish Museum in San Francisco. This makes her the first American female sofer to scribe a Sefer Torah; Julie Seltzer was born in Philadelphia and is non-denominationally Jewish.
  - The Evangelical Presbyterian Church's 31st General Assembly voted to allow congregations to call women to ordained ministry, even if their presbytery (governing body) objects for theological or doctrinal reasons. Such congregations will be allowed to leave the objecting presbytery (such as the Central South, which includes Memphis) and join an adjacent one that permits the ordination of women.
  - The American Catholic Church in the United States, ACCUS, ordained their first woman priest, Kathleen Maria MacPherson, on June 12, 2011.
- 2012:
  - Ilana Mills was ordained, thus making her, Jordana Chernow-Reader, and Mari Chernow the first three female siblings in America to become rabbis.
  - Miri Gold, born in the United States, became the first non-Orthodox rabbi (and the first female rabbi) to have her salary paid by the Israeli government.
  - Christine Lee was ordained as the Episcopal Church's first female Korean-American priest.
- Ann Svennungsen became bishop in Evangelical Lutheran Church in America
- 2013:
  - The Evangelical Lutheran Church in America, the largest Lutheran denomination in the U.S., elected its first female presiding bishop (the Revd Elizabeth Eaton).
  - Mary Froiland was the first woman elected as a bishop in the South-Central Synod of Wisconsin of the Evangelical Lutheran Church of America.
  - On September 22, 2013, Congregation Beth Elohim of New York dedicated a new Torah, which members of Beth Elohim said was the first Torah in New York City to be scribed by a woman. The Torah was scribed by Linda Coppleson.
  - The first class of female halachic advisers trained to practice in the U.S. graduated; they graduated from the North American branch of Nishmat's yoetzet halacha program in a ceremony at Congregation Sheartith Israel, Spanish and Portuguese Synagogue in Manhattan.
  - On October 27, 2013, Sandra Roberts became the first woman to lead a Seventh-day Adventist conference when she was elected as president of the Southeastern California Conference. However, the worldwide Seventh-day Adventist church did not recognize this because presidents of conferences must be ordained pastors and the worldwide church did not recognize the ordination of women.
  - Yeshivat Maharat, located in the United States, became the first Orthodox Jewish institution to consecrate female clergy. The graduates of Yeshivat Maharat did not call themselves "rabbis." The title they were given is "maharat." However, in 2015 Yaffa Epstein was ordained as Rabba by the Yeshivat Maharat. Also that year, Lila Kagedan was ordained as Rabbi by the Yeshivat Maharat, making her their first graduate to take the title Rabbi.
- 2014:
  - Fanny Sohet Belanger, born in France, was ordained in America and thus became the first French female priest in the Episcopal Church.
  - Heather Cook was the first woman elected as a bishop in the Episcopal Diocese of Maryland.
  - American rabbi Deborah Waxman was inaugurated as the president of the Reconstructionist Rabbinical College and Jewish Reconstructionist Communities on October 26, 2014. As the president of the Reconstructionist Rabbinical College, she is believed to be the first woman and first lesbian to lead a Jewish congregational union, and the first female rabbi and first lesbian to lead a Jewish seminary; the Reconstructionist Rabbinical College is both a congregational union and a seminary.
  - Gayle Harris of the Episcopal Diocese of Massachusetts became the first female Anglican bishop to preside and preach in a Welsh cathedral.
  - It was announced that Lauma Lagzdins Zusevics, an American, was the first woman elected Archbishop of the Latvian Evangelical Lutheran Church Abroad.
- 2015:
  - Mira Rivera became the first Filipino-American woman to be ordained as a rabbi.
  - The Women's Mosque of America, which claims to be America's first female-only mosque, opened in Los Angeles.
  - In the GC session in Dallas on July 9, 2015, Seventh-day Adventists voted not to allow their regional church bodies to ordain women pastors.
  - Yaffa Epstein was ordained as Rabba by the Yeshivat Maharat, located in the United States.
  - Lila Kagedan was ordained as Rabbi by the Yeshivat Maharat, located in the United States, making her their first graduate to take the title Rabbi.
  - The Rabbinical Council of America passed a resolution which states, "RCA members with positions in Orthodox institutions may not ordain women into the Orthodox rabbinate, regardless of the title used; or hire or ratify the hiring of a woman into a rabbinic position at an Orthodox institution; or allow a title implying rabbinic ordination to be used by a teacher of Limudei Kodesh in an Orthodox institution."
  - The Agudath Israel of America denounced moves to ordain women, and went even further, declaring Yeshivat Maharat, Yeshivat Chovevei Torah, Open Orthodoxy, and other affiliated entities to be similar to other dissident movements throughout Jewish history in having rejected basic tenets of Judaism.
- 2016: Lila Kagedan became the first female clergy member hired by an Orthodox synagogue while using the title "rabbi." This occurred when Mount Freedom Jewish Center in New Jersey, which is Open Orthodox, hired Kagedan to join their "spiritual leadership team."
- 2017:
  - The Orthodox Union adopted a policy banning women from serving as clergy, from holding titles such as "rabbi", or from doing common clergy functions even without a title, in its congregations in the United States.
  - Ruti Regan became the first openly autistic person to be ordained by the Jewish Theological Seminary of America.
- 2018:
  - Lauren Tuchman was ordained by the Jewish Theological Seminary of America and thus became the first ordained blind female rabbi.
  - The Orthodox Union stated that the four OU synagogues that already employed women clergy would be allowed to stay in the OU without making any changes.
  - Patricia A. Davenport became the first African American woman to be elected a bishop in the Evangelical Lutheran Church in America; she was elected to head the Southeastern Pennsylvania Synod.
- 2019:
  - Ohio minister Donna Barrett was elected as Assemblies of God general secretary, which was the first time the Assemblies of God General Council elected a woman to its executive leadership; she had been appointed to the post the previous year, which had made her the first woman to fill a seat on the Assemblies of God's six-person executive leadership team.
  - A social statement from the Evangelical Lutheran Church in America, titled "Faith, Sexism, and Justice: A Call to Action", was approved by the ELCA's Churchwide Assembly on August 9; it calls sexism and patriarchy sins and acknowledges the church's complicity in them.

=== 2020s ===
- 2022:
  - The Rocky Mountain Conference (RMC) of the Seventh-day Adventist Church approved ordaining women pastors.
- 2023:
- In June 2023, the Christian and Missionary Alliance of the United States approved women being ordained as pastors, but only if the women's local church leadership approves, and never as senior or lead pastors.
- Myriam Ackermann-Sommer of France received a rabbinical degree from Yeshivat Maharat in America, thus making her France's first female Orthodox rabbi.
- 2024:
- Shoshana Nambi, born in Kenya, became the first female rabbi from Uganda; she was ordained by the Hebrew Union College – Jewish Institute of Religion in New York.
- 2025:
- Katrina Foster became the first woman and the first openly gay bishop of the Metropolitan New York Synod of the Evangelical Lutheran Church in America.

== See also ==
- Religion in the United States
- Timeline of women in religion
- Timeline of women's ordination
- Timeline of women rabbis (largely populated with American women rabbis)
- Women as theological figures
