= Decree on the Attempted Ordination of Some Catholic Women =

Roman Catholic canonical decree

Decree on the Attempted Ordination of Some Catholic Women is a canonical decree issued by the Congregation for the Doctrine of the Faith, under Cardinal Joseph Ratzinger, and approved by Pope John Paul II on December 21, 2002. It can be found in Acta Apostolicae Sedis 95 (2003). The decree is in response to Romulo Antonio Braschi ordaining seven Catholic women to the priesthood of his movement, the Catholic Apostolic Charismatic Church of Jesus the King, on June 29, 2002, and is a follow-up to a decree of excommunication of Braschi and the women issued on August 5, 2002.

== Background ==
In 1998, Braschi left the Catholic Church for the Catholic Apostolic Charismatic Church of Jesus the King and became bishop of it. On June 29, 2002, on a boat on the Danube River, Austria, Braschi ordained seven Catholic women, called the Danube Seven, to the priesthood: Christine Mayr-Lumetzberger, Adelinde Roitinger, Gisela Forster, Iris Müller, Ida Raming, Pia Brunner and Dagmar Braun Celeste (who called herself Angela White). The Bishop of Linz and of the Austrian Episcopal Conference intervened, but to no avail. On July 10, the Congregation for the Doctrine of the Faith warned the eight persons that they would be excommunicated on July 22 if they did not repent. On August 5, the Congregation issued a decree of excommunication of the eight persons. The excommunicated people then published letters and granted interviews about the ordinations, explaining why they considered them valid, that the Catholic Church ought to allow women to be ordained, and how they had celebrated the sacraments. On August 14 and September 27, the people requested the Congregation to revoke the excommunication. The latter request made reference to canons regarding recourse against administrative decrees in the 1983 Code of Canon Law. On October 21, the Congregation replied that it would look into the matter.

== Contents ==
The decree explains the excommunicated party's background, then the Congregation for the Doctrine of the Faith's response to the party's request for the revocation of their excommunication. The response was prepared by fifteen members of the Congregation: Cardinals Joseph Ratzinger, Alfonso López Trujillo, Ignace Moussa I. Daoud, Giovanni Battista Re, Francis Arinze, Jozef Tomko, Achille Silvestrini, Jorge Medina Estévez, James Francis Stafford, Zenon Grocholewski, Walter Kasper, Crescenzio Sepe, Mario Francesco Pompedda and Bishops Tarcisio Bertone, SDB, and Rino Fisichella. The fifteen members met multiple times to discuss the matter, and ultimately came to a "collegial decision" to not revoke the excommunication. The Congregation listed their reasons for why this was the case: the excommunication was not a latae sententiae penalty, but a ferendae sententiae penalty, as per Canons 1314, 1319, and 1347; the excommunication was issued by the Pope through the Congregation, as per Canon 360; the offense was grave and evident; the women, by choosing to be ordained by a schismatic, became schismatics themselves; the women rejected the magisterium of the Pope and the teaching on ordination that he definitively proposed in Ordinatio sacerdotalis; the women, by inciting other Catholics to schism, were justly punished so as to protect the faith, communion and unity of the church and guide the consciences of the faithful; and the excommunication was intended to provoke the six persons to repentance.

== See also ==
- Ordination of women and the Catholic Church
- Roman Catholic Womenpriests, said to be begun by the Danube Seven
