= Monitum =

Warning issued by the Congregation for the Doctrine of the Faith

A monitum is a warning issued by the Congregation for the Doctrine of the Faith to an errant cleric, who is in danger of receiving an additional penalty.

== Notable cases ==
=== Teilhard de Chardin ===
The writings, not named but described as "gaining a good deal of success", including some published posthumously, of Pierre Teilhard de Chardin were the subject of a monitum by the Holy Office in June 1962, seven years after Teilhard's death.

=== The Danube Seven ===
The Danube Seven – seven women on whom Rómulo Antonio Braschi, the founder of a schismatic community, attempted to confer priestly ordination on June 29, 2002 – were the target of a monitum dated 10 July 2002. The women were: Christine Mayr-Lumetzberger, Adelinde Theresia Roitinger, Gisela Forster, Iris Müller, Ida Raming, Pia Brunner, and Angela White (pseudonym of Dagmar Braun Celeste).

=== Hans Küng ===
In 1975, the CDF issued a monitum against certain of Hans Küng's writings.

=== Form criticism ===
In 1961, the Holy Office issued a monitum against the use of form criticism in Catholic scriptural interpretation.

=== Vernacular publications of the Bible ===
In 1856, a monitum was published under Pope Pius IX which re-iterated the ban on publishing vernacular editions of the Bible which had not been approved by the Pope or the competent church authority.

== See also ==
- Vetitum
