= Patricia Fresen =

Orders
- Ordination: by Romulo Antonio Braschi

Personal details
- Denomination: Roman Catholic Womenpriests

Bishop Patricia Fresen (7 December 1940 - 3 September 2024) was a South African writer, a Catholic theologian, and a former nun.

== Life ==
Her parents were from Germany and Ireland. After school, Fresen became a member of the Dominican Order. Fresen studied theology, pedagogic and languages and subsequently became a teacher. Fresen was then sent to Rome to study theology. She later worked in Pretoria in a Catholic seminary as teacher in Homiletics, Systematic theology and Spirituality. She then taught at St Augustine's College in Johannesburg.

Bishop Romulo Antonio Braschi conducted an ordination ceremony for Fresen in Barcelona in 2003. The Congregation for the Doctrine of the Faith had previously decreed that the "attempted ordination of women" by Romulo Braschi was null and void and, as a result, imposed the penalty of excommunication on him and those who received ordination from him for reasons including the "attempted ordination" as well as participating in schism. Together with German writers and theologians Gisela Forster and Ida Raming, Fresen was head of the international organization "Roman Catholic Womenpriests International", which promotes the ordination of women as Catholic priests; ordination of women is currently not allowed within the Catholic Church.
