= Roy Bourgeois =

American activist and former Catholic priest (born 1938)

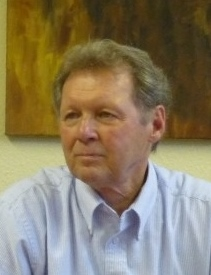
- Roy Bourgeois in 2013
- Born: December 15, 1938 (age 87); Lutcher, Louisiana, U.S.
- Education: University of Louisiana, Lafayette
- Occupation: Activist
- Known for: SOA Watch (founder)
- Website: roybourgeoisjourney.org

Roy Bourgeois (born January 27, 1938) is an American activist, a former Catholic priest, and the founder of the human rights group School of the Americas Watch (SOA Watch). He is the 1994 recipient of the Gandhi Peace Award and the 2011 recipient of the American Peace Award and also has been nominated for the Nobel Peace Prize.

Ordained to the priesthood in 1972 in the Roman Catholic Church's Maryknoll society of apostolic life's Maryknoll Fathers and Brothers (The Catholic Foreign Mission Society of America), Bourgeois was canonically dismissed forty years later, on October 4, 2012, from both the Maryknolls and the priesthood, because of his participation on August 9, 2008, in what was, according to the Roman Catholic Church, considered an invalid ordination of a woman and "a simulated Mass" in Lexington, Kentucky.

== Early life ==
Bourgeois was born in Lutcher, Louisiana, on January 27, 1938. He grew up in a Catholic working-class family, and attended the University of Southwestern Louisiana and graduated with a Bachelor of Science degree in geology. From 1956–57 Bourgeois had a brief stint as an actor, playing helicopter pilot Roy in eight episodes of the Highway Patrol television series (including the episodes Desert Copter and Ranch Copter) and having an uncredited bit role in the film adaptation of the John Steinbeck novel The Wayward Bus.

=== Naval service ===
After graduation from college, Bourgeois entered the United States Navy and served as an officer for four years. He spent two years at sea, one year at a station in Europe, and two tours of duty during one year in Vietnam, during the first of which he was injured during fighting in Saigon and received the Purple Heart.

After military service, he entered the Maryknoll Society in 1966; then entered the seminary of the Catholic missionary society of Maryknoll Fathers and Brothers, Glen Ellyn, (Catholic Foreign Mission Society of America), and was ordained as a Catholic priest in 1972.

== Career ==
From 1972 to 1975, Bourgeois began the work of his priesthood in La Paz, Bolivia aiding the poor. In 1975 he was accused of, and was arrested for, attempting to overthrow Bolivian dictator Hugo Banzer, a 1958 graduate of the School of the Americas (SOA) at Fort Benning, in Columbus, Georgia. Bourgeois was eventually deported from Bolivia and returned to the United States.

In 1980, Bourgeois moved to a Catholic Worker house in Chicago where he continued his work with the poor. He became an outspoken critic of US foreign policy in Latin America after four American churchwomen were (three of them nuns, and two of them personal friends of Bourgeois) were brutally raped and murdered by a death squad consisting of soldiers from the Salvadoran National Guard, some of whom had been trained at the SOA/WHINSEC.

In 1989, Bourgeois's criticism of US foreign policy in Latin America intensified on November 16, 1989, when six Jesuit priests, their housekeeper, and the housekeeper's daughter were massacred on the campus of Universidad Centroamericana "José Simeón Cañas" (UCA) in San Salvador, El Salvador. Armed men in uniform burst into their shared residence and indiscriminately gunned-down everyone within. The massacre was performed by the Atlácatl Battalion, an elite unit of the Salvadoran Army, and a rapid-response, counter-insurgency battalion created in 1980 at SOA/WHINSEC.

In 1990, Bourgeois founded the School of the Americas Watch (SOA Watch), a not-for-profit organization that seeks to close the SOA (since 2000 known as WHINSEC) and to change U.S. foreign policy in Latin America by educating the public, lobbying Congress and participating in creative, nonviolent resistance such as demonstrations and nonviolent protest. The SOA/WHINSEC has long maintained that it does not teach tactics that can be used on civilians but, rather, simply sharpens the military skills of soldiers from participating countries. Its website says it "provides professional education and training for civilian, military and law enforcement students." SOA Watch claims its work caused the Pentagon to respond to the growing anti-SOA movement with a PR campaign to give the SOA a new image. "In an attempt to disassociate the school with its horrific past," the SOA Watch website claims, "the SOA was renamed the Western Hemisphere Institute for Security Cooperation (WHINSEC) in January 2001."

In 1998, Bourgeois testified before a Spanish judge seeking the extradition of Chile's ex-dictator General Augusto Pinochet.

In August 2008, in keeping with his belief that women should be ordained to the Roman Catholic priesthood, Bourgeois was a celebrant in, and delivered the homily at the ordination ceremony of Janice Sevre-Duszynska, a member of Womenpriests, at a Unitarian Universalist church in Lexington, Kentucky.

In 2011, Bourgeois was briefly detained by police at the Vatican on October 17, when he tried to deliver a petition to the Holy See with a number of women priests, who were dressed in their liturgical garments.

In 2012, Bourgeois was part of a panel discussion at the New York premiere of the documentary Pink Smoke Over the Vatican. The film features activists for women's ordination in the Catholic Church, and included clips of an interview with him.

In November, 2024, Bourgeois published a commentary in National Catholic Reporter, reflecting on his activism for ordination of women, and his consequent excommunication. He reiterated his views that the priesthood of women is an issue of conscience and equality, and essential to survival of the church. He expressed similar views in a YouTube interview with Chris Hedges, in December, 2022. A December, 2025, newspaper article reports that Bourgeois is still living in a small apartment outside Ft. Benning, Georgia, spending time in reading and contemplation.

== Controversy ==
=== Federal prison ===
Bourgeois has spent over four years in federal prisons for nonviolent protests, including entering Fort Benning. He and more than 240 peace activists have been tried and jailed for peacefully demonstrating at the gates of the SOA/WHINSEC.

=== Excommunication ===
The Vatican's Congregation for the Doctrine of the Faith issued a decree in May 2008 formally declaring that a woman who attempts to be ordained a Catholic priest, and the persons attempting to ordain her, are automatically excommunicated. Three months later Fr. Bourgeois was a celebrant in, and delivered the homily during the ordination of Janice Sevre-Duszynska under the auspices of the group Roman Catholic Womenpriests, which rejects the Church's teaching on the all-male priesthood. The ceremony was not recognized by the Vatican; and its May 2008 declaration meant that Bourgeois was excommunicated latae sententiae.

Bourgeois received a letter from the Congregation for the Doctrine of the Faith which explained what the letter called his "errors" along with "a genuine concern for his salvation". It gave him 30 days from October 21, 2008, to recant his "belief and public statements that support the ordination of women in our Church, or (he) will be excommunicated." Bourgeois refused; and so was excommunicated latae sententiae on November 24, 2008.

For the next nearly four years Bourgeois continued to both act and be recognized as a priest, while he and Dominican Fr. Tom Doyle, a canon lawyer acting on Bourgeois' behalf, asked for discussions and negotiations on the matter with the Maryknoll Society and, through it, the Holy See. At no time, during any of it, did Bourgeois recant his position on women's ordination to the priesthood.

On May 22, 1994, Pope John Paul II released an apostolic letter, addressed to the Bishops of the Catholic Church, entitled "On Reserving Priestly Ordination to Men Alone (Ordinatio Sacerdotalis)," which closes as follows:

Although the teaching that priestly ordination is to be reserved to men alone has been preserved by the constant and universal Tradition of the Church and firmly taught by the Magisterium in its more recent documents, at the present time in some places it is nonetheless considered still open to debate, or the Church's judgment that women are not to be admitted to ordination is considered to have a merely disciplinary force. Wherefore, in order that all doubt may be removed regarding a matter of great importance, a matter which pertains to the Church's divine constitution itself, in virtue of my ministry of confirming the brethren (cf. Lk 22:32) I declare that the Church has no authority whatsoever to confer priestly ordination on women and that this judgment is to be definitively held by all the Church's faithful.

"Arguments against this clear and authoritative teaching," wrote Keith Fournier on Catholic Online, "sometimes come from people who do not understand that the priesthood is not a job and have succumbed to the 'rights' mentality of the current age. Other times they come from people who have no understanding of the sacramental nature of the Church. Both groups may include among them Catholics who, as in too many other areas of doctrine, have not been properly catechized."

Holding that the Roman Catholic church has no authority to ordain women, Pope Benedict XVI reaffirmed the Church's ban on women priests at the Vatican's 2012 Holy Thursday chrism Mass.

=== Maryknoll expulsion ===
On March 18, 2011, Fr. Bourgeois was given a letter from Fr. Edward M. Dougherty, Maryknoll's Superior General, and Edward J. McGovern, its Secretary General, warning Bourgeois that he had 15 days to recant his support for women's ordination or he would face expulsion from the society. Bourgeois responded in a letter dated April 8, 2011, stating that he could not recant without betraying his conscience.

On July 22, 2011, 157 Catholic priests signed a letter, addressed to Dougherty, in support of Bourgeois's priesthood and work, and his right to conscience. While the letter did not specifically address the issue of women's ordination, it did indicate the signees' support of the right of priests to speak from conscience without being in danger of sanction.

Following his refusal to recant, the society issued Bourgeois a second canonical warning; the final notice of pending removal from the Maryknoll Society, on July 27, 2011. In his August 8, 2011, letter of response, Bourgeois wrote, in part:

I believe that our Church's teaching that excludes women from the priesthood defies both faith and reason and cannot stand up to scrutiny. This teaching has nothing to do with God, but with men, and is rooted in sexism. Sexism, like racism, is a sin. And no matter how hard we may try to justify discrimination against women, in the end, it is not the way of God, but of men who want to hold on to their power. As people of faith we believe in the primacy of conscience. Our conscience connects us to the Divine. Our conscience gives us a sense of right and wrong and urges us to do what is right, what is just. What you are asking me to do in your letter is not possible without betraying my conscience. In essence, you are telling me to lie and say I do not believe that God calls both men and women to the priesthood. This I cannot do, therefore I will not recant. I firmly believe that the exclusion of women from the priesthood is a grave injustice against women, against our Church, and against our God.

On August 16, 2011, Bourgeois's canon lawyer Fr. Thomas Doyle wrote a letter to the Maryknoll Society asking that "reputable theologians" be brought in to examine the case "in order to look much more deeply" into two central issues: the Church's claim that the teaching on women's ordination is infallible, and the right of a Catholic "to act and think according to the dictates of his conscience" even if the conclusions put one in conflict with the Church's highest authorities.

In February 2012, Maryknoll's U.S. regional superior, Fr. Mike Duggan, told both Bourgeois and Doyle, over the phone, that the order's general council, which consists of its superior general and three assistant generals, would be voting, in March 2012, on whether to dismiss Bourgeois from the Maryknoll Society.

In March 2012, the four-person general council met to vote, but because canon law mandates that at least five people must vote on issues of dismissal from religious orders, Duggan had told Doyle that an unnamed fifth person from the order had been brought in to join the general council in the vote. The Maryknoll Society's official statement about the vote was that it was a split decision, with no clear outcome. However, both Bourgeois and Doyle said, after the vote, that Duggan told them that only two of the five general council members voted for Bourgeois's dismissal, while three abstained. The general council then sent a letter to the Vatican containing the results of the vote.

On June 6, 2012, Bourgeois and Doyle met with Dougherty and a mediator at the society's headquarters in New York. Bourgeois and Doyle said no mention was made of the dismissal vote; and Bourgeois added that the two-hour meeting focused on the issue of conscience and "the importance of people of faith and members of Maryknoll to be able to speak openly and freely without fear ... of being dismissed or excommunicated." Doyle said the outcome of the meeting was "far different than we expected and far more positive."

=== Laicization ===
On Monday, November 19, 2012, the Maryknoll Society's Maryknoll Fathers and Brothers issued an official statement indicating that the Vatican's Congregation for the Doctrine of the Faith had ruled, on October 4, 2012, that Bourgeois had been canonically dismissed from both the Maryknolls, and the Roman Catholic priesthood, thereby laicizing him. The full statement from the Maryknoll Fathers and Brothers:

FOR IMMEDIATE RELEASE

The Congregation For The Doctrine Of The Faith
Canonically Dismisses Roy Bourgeois

Maryknoll, New York – November 19, 2012 – The Vatican's Congregation for the Doctrine of the Faith, on October 4, 2012, canonically dismissed Roy Bourgeois from the Catholic Foreign Mission Society of America, also known as the Maryknoll Fathers and Brothers. The decision dispenses the Maryknoll priest from his sacred bonds.

As a priest during 2008, Mr. Bourgeois participated in the invalid ordination of a woman and a simulated Mass in Lexington, Kentucky. With patience, the Holy See and the Maryknoll Society have encouraged his reconciliation with the Catholic Church.

Instead, Mr. Bourgeois chose to campaign against the teachings of the Catholic Church in secular and non-Catholic venues. This was done without the permission of the local U.S. Catholic Bishops and while ignoring the sensitivities of the faithful across the country. Disobedience and preaching against the teaching of the Catholic Church about women's ordination led to his excommunication, dismissal and laicization.

Mr. Bourgeois freely chose his views and actions, and all the members of the Maryknoll Society are saddened at the failure of reconciliation. With this parting, the Maryknoll Society warmly thanks Roy Bourgeois for his service to mission and all members wish him well in his personal life. In the spirit of equity and charity, Maryknoll will assist Mr. Bourgeois with this transition.

Dominican Fr. Thomas Doyle, Bourgeois's canon lawyer, said he was surprised, especially after he and Bourgeois met with Maryknoll's superior general, Fr. Edward Dougherty, in June, and the issue of dismissal had not been discussed. "The idea then was that things would continue and they would not dismiss Roy and they would continue to dialogue," Doyle said. "And then this just happened, unilaterally. We had no idea."

In response, Bourgeois issued the following official statement:

November 20, 2012

STATEMENT ABOUT MY DISMISSAL FROM MARYKNOLL

I have been a Catholic priest in the Maryknoll community for 40 years. As a young man I joined Maryknoll because of its work for justice and equality in the world. To be expelled from Maryknoll and the priesthood for believing that women are also called to be priests is very difficult and painful.

The Vatican and Maryknoll can dismiss me, but they cannot dismiss the issue of gender equality in the Catholic Church. The demand for gender equality is rooted in justice and dignity and will not go away.

As Catholics, we profess that God created men and women of equal worth and dignity. As priests, we profess that the call to the priesthood comes from God, only God. Who are we, as men, to say that our call from God is authentic, but God's call to women is not? The exclusion of women from the priesthood is a grave injustice against women, our Church and our loving God who calls both men and women to be priests.

When there is an injustice, silence is the voice of complicity. My conscience compelled me to break my silence and address the sin of sexism in my Church. My only regret is that it took me so long to confront the issue of male power and domination in the Catholic Church.

I have explained my position on the ordination of women, and how I came to it, in my booklet: "My Journey from Silence to Solidarity."

In Solidarity,

Roy Bourgeois

== Support ==
In its November 20, 2012, statement, Erin Saiz Hanna, Executive Director of the Women's Ordination Conference wrote of Bourgeois: "While he is devastated to lose his community, and saddened by the harshness of this final step, he remains steadfast in his faith and conscience. He has asked for solitude and prayers during this time of transition."

In its December 3, 2012, editorial column, the National Catholic Reporter stated that "the call to priesthood is a gift from God," and came out unequivocally in support of Roy Bourgeois and his campaign in support of women's ordination to the Catholic priesthood.

On April 24, 2015, Bourgeois and three others were arrested for an unlawful entry charge at the El Salvador embassy.

== Awards ==
- Gandhi Peace Award (1994)
- Franciscan Peacemaker of the Year Award (1996)
- Pax Christi USA Pope Paul VI Teacher of Peace Award (1997)
- Adela Dwyer/St. Thomas of Villanova Peace Award, Villanova University (1998)
- Isaac Hecker Award for Social Justice, Paulist Center, Boston (1999)
- Aachen Peace Prize (2005)
- Thomas Merton Award (2005)
- Annunciation House Voice of the Voiceless Award (2008)
- Voice of the Faithful Priest of Integrity Award (2009)
- Nominated for a Nobel Peace Prize for his work with School of the Americas Watch (2010)
- American Peace Award (2011)
- Episcopal Peace Fellowship Passion For Peace Award (2011)
- Honorary Doctor of Divinity degree, Chicago Theological Seminary (2012)
- DignityUSA Risk Taker and Justice Maker Award (2013)
- Veteran's For Peace Leadership In Peace Award (2014)
- Wade Mackie Peacemaking Award (2014)
- Peace House Annual Peacemaker Award (2016)
