= Dispensation (Catholic canon law) =

Exemption from the obligation of law in some cases

In the jurisprudence of the canon law of the Catholic Church, a dispensation is the exemption from the immediate obligation of the law in certain cases. Its object is to modify the hardship often caused by rigorous application of general laws to particular cases, and its essence is to preserve the law by suspending its operation in such cases.

== Concept ==
Since laws aimed at the good of the entire community may not be suitable for certain cases or persons, the legislator has the right, sometimes even the duty, to dispense from (Note: Unlike the English idiom "dispense with", the canonical idiom is "dispense from") the law.

Dispensation is not a permanent power or a special right, as in privilege. If the reason for the dispensation no longer exists, then the dispensation also ceases to exist. If the immediate basis for the right is withdrawn, then the right ceases.

=== Validity, legality, "just and reasonable cause" ===
There must be a "just and reasonable cause" for granting a dispensation. What is "just and reasonable" is based upon the particular situation and the importance of the law to be dispensed from. If the cause is not "just and reasonable", then the dispensation is illegal and, if issued by someone other than the lawgiver of the law in question, or his superior, the dispensation is also invalid. If it is uncertain whether a sufficiently "just and reasonable cause" exists, the dispensation is both legal and valid.

== Contemporary use ==
The actual practice of the Roman Catholic Church is based upon the decisions of the Council of Trent, which left the medieval theory intact, while endeavouring to guard against its abuses. The proposal put forward by the Galician and Spanish bishops to subordinate the papal power of dispensation to the consent of the Church in general council was rejected. The canons of the council of Trent, in so far as they affected reformation of morals or ecclesiastical discipline, were decreed "saving the authority of the Holy See" (Sess. xxv. cap. 21, de ref.). At the same time, it was laid down in respect of all dispensations, whether papal or other, that they were to be granted only for just and urgent causes, or in view of some decided benefit to the Church (urgens justaque causa et major quandoque utilitas), and in all cases for free. Payment of money for a dispensation would void the dispensation (Sess. xxv. cap. 18, de ref.). The power to dispense lies with the original lawgiver, with his successors or with his superiors, and with those to whom the right has been delegated. Since there is no superior above the pope, he can dispense from all canonical laws: universal laws introduced by himself, his predecessors or general councils, and particular laws enacted by plenary and provincial councils, bishops and similar prelates. As a general rule the pope delegates his powers to the various congregations of the Roman Curia, which are charged with granting dispensations in matters within the sphere of their competence.

=== Papal dispensation ===
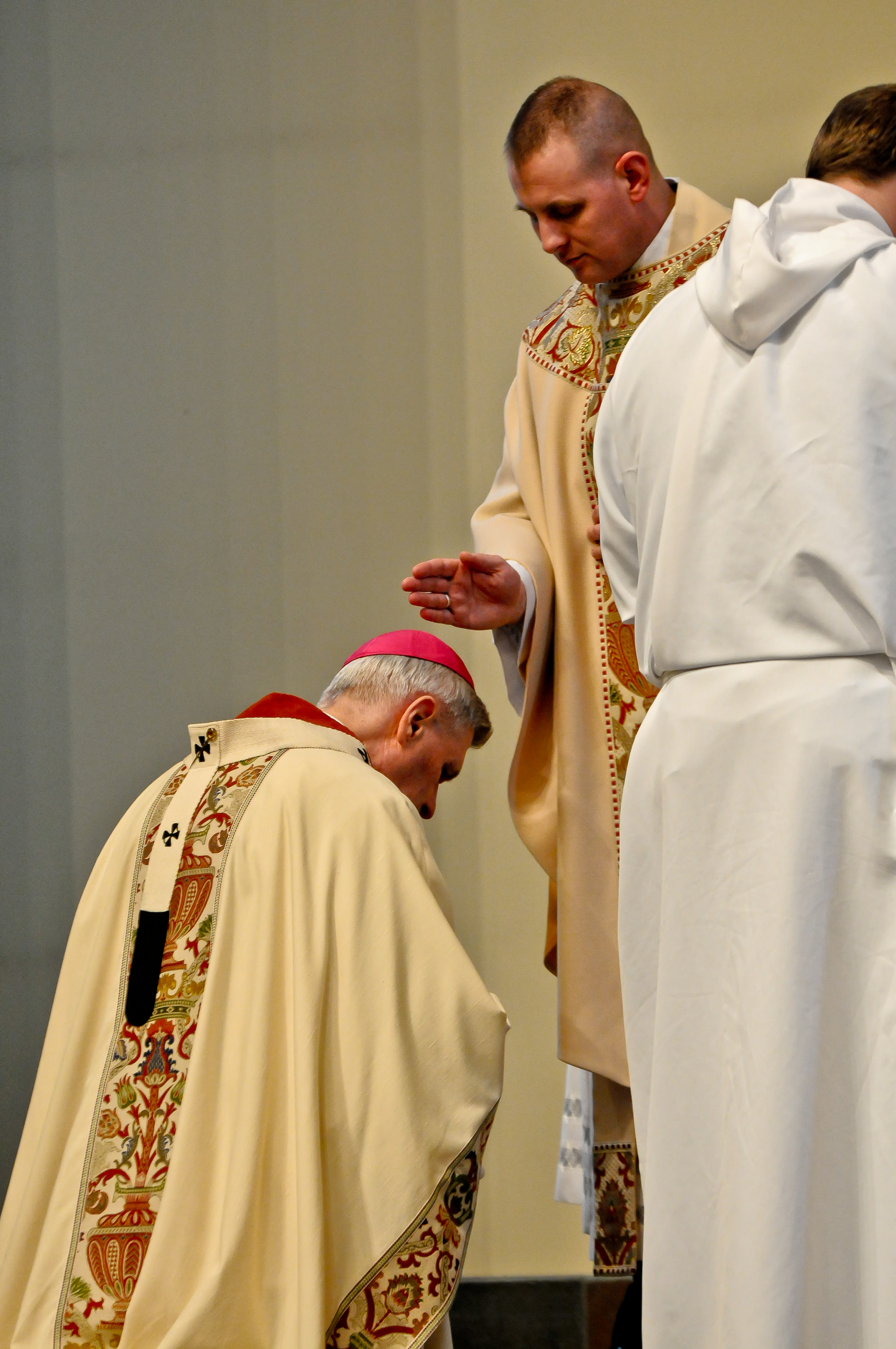
A married former Anglican gives his first blessing as a Catholic priest. The Holy See has at times granted dispensations from the celibacy requirement for former Anglican priests and former Lutheran ministers.

Papal dispensation is a reserved right of the pope that allows for individuals to be exempted from a specific Canon law. Dispensations are divided into two categories: general, and matrimonial. Matrimonial dispensations can be either to allow a marriage in the first place, or to dissolve one. The authority for the pope to exempt an individual or situation from a law stems from his position as the Vicar of Christ, which implies divine authority and knowledge, as well as jurisdiction.

== Matrimonial dispensation ==
A matrimonial dispensation is the relaxation in a particular case of an impediment prohibiting or annulling a marriage. It may be granted:

- in favour of a contemplated marriage or to legitimize one already contracted;
- in secret cases, or in public cases, or in both;
- in the internal forum only, or in the external forum, which includes the former.

Dispensation in the internal forum is not always restricted to secret cases (casus occulti). These expressions are by no means identical.

=== General powers of dispensation ===
==== Pope and the curia ====
The pope cannot dispense from impediments founded on Divine law—except in the case of vows, non-consummated marriages, or valid and consummated marriage of neophytes before baptism. In doubtful cases, however, he may decide authoritatively as to the objective value of the doubt. In respect of impediments arising from ecclesiastical law, the pope has full dispensing power. Every such dispensation granted is valid, and when the pope acts with a sufficient motive, it is also licit.

The pope may not exercise this power personally, unless in very exceptional cases, where certain specific impediments are in question. These are error, violence, holy orders, disparity of worship, public conjugicide, consanguinity in the direct line or in the first degree (equal) of the collateral Line and the first degree of affinity (from lawful intercourse) in the direct line. As a rule, the pope exercises his power of dispensation through the Roman Congregations and Tribunals.

Until around the 1900s, the Dataria was the most important channel for matrimonial dispensations when the impediment was public or about to become public within a short time. The Holy Office, however, had exclusive control in the external forum over all impediments connected with or juridically bearing on matters of faith, e. g. disparity of worship, mixta religio, holy orders, etc. The dispensing power in the internal forum lay with the Penitentiaria, and in the case of poor and quasi-poor people had dispensing power over public impediments in the external forum as well. The Penitentiaria held as poor, for all countries outside of Italy, those whose united capital, productive of a fixed revenue, did not exceed 5370 lire (about 1050 dollars); and as quasi-poor, those whose capital did not exceed 9396 lire (about 1850 dollars). It likewise had the power of promulgating general indults affecting public impediments, as for instance the indult of 15 November 1907. The Congregation for the Evangelization of Peoples was charged with all dispensations, in both forums, for countries under its jurisdiction, as was the Congregation of Extraordinary Ecclesiastical Affairs for all countries depending on it, e. g. Russia, Latin America and certain apostolic vicariates and apostolic prefectures.

On 3 November 1908, the duties of these various Congregations received important modifications as a consequence of the apostolic constitution "Sapienti", in which Pope Pius X reorganized the Roman Curia. Dispensing power from public impediments in the case of poor and quasi-poor people was transferred from the Dataria and the Penitentiaria to the newly established Congregatio de Disciplinâ Sacramentorum, the Penitentiaria retaining dispensing power over occult impediments in the internal forum only. The Holy Office retained its faculties, but restricted expressly to three general cases: disparity of worship, mixta religio, and the Pauline privilege.

The Congregation for the Evangelization of Peoples remained the channel for securing dispensations for all countries under its jurisdiction, but as it was required for the sake of executive unity, to defer, in all matters concerning matrimony, to the various Congregations competent to act, its function became that of intermediary. In America, the United States, Canada and Newfoundland, and in Europe, the British Isles were withdrawn from the Congregation, and placed under the common law of countries with a hierarchy. The Congregation of Extraordinary Ecclesiastical Affairs lost all its powers; consequently the countries that were subject to it must address themselves either to the Holy Office or to the Congregatio de Disciplinâ Sacramentorum according to the nature of the impediment.

The powers of any Congregation are suspended during the vacancy of the Holy See, except those of the Apostolic Penitentiary in the internal forum, which during that time are even increased. Though suspended, the powers of a Congregation may be used in cases of urgent necessity.

==== Diocesan bishops ====
By virtue of their jurisdiction, bishops can dispense from impediments not reserved to the pope. The reserved impediments are engagements, the vow of perpetual chastity, and vows taken in diocesan religious institutes, mixta religio, public display and solemn blessing at marriages within forbidden times, a vetitum, or interdict laid on a marriage by the pope, or by the metropolitan in a case of appeal. The bishop may also dispense from diriment impediments in two different ways. Either by tacit consent of the Holy See a bishop can dispense in the internal forum from secret impediments where the pope is used to exercise his power of dispensing, in three cases:

- Marriages already contracted and consummated, when urgent necessity arises (i. e. when the interested parties cannot be separated without scandal or endangering their souls, and there is no time to have recourse to the Holy See or to its delegate)—it is, however, necessary that such marriage shall have taken place in lawful form before the Church, and that one of the contracting parties at least shall have been ignorant of the impediment;
- In marriages about to be contracted and which are called embarrassing (perplexi) cases, i. e. where everything being ready a delay would be defamatory or would cause scandal;
- When there is a serious doubt of fact as to the existence of an impediment; in this case the dispensation seems to hold good, even though in course of time the impediment may become certain, and even public.
- In cases where the law is doubtful no dispensation is necessary; but the bishop may, if he thinks proper, declare authentically the existence and sufficiency of such doubt.

By virtue of a decree of the Congregation of the Inquisition or Holy Office (20 February 1888) diocesan bishops and other ordinaries (especially a Vicar Apostolic, administrator Apostolic and Prefect Apostolic, with jurisdiction over a territory, as well as a vicar-general in spiritualibus and a vicar capitular) may dispense in very urgent (gravissimum) danger of death from all diriment impediments, whether secret or public, of ecclesiastical law, except priesthood and affinity from lawful intercourse in the direct line. However, this privilege can only be used in favour of persons actually living in real concubinage or united by a merely civil marriage, and only when there is no time for recourse to the Holy See. They may also legitimize the children of such unions, except those born of adultery or sacrilege. The decree of 1888 included the impediment of clandestinity. This decree permits, at least until the Holy See has issued other instructions, to dispense, in the case of concubinage or civil marriage, with the presence of the priest and of the two witnesses required by the Decree "Ne temere" in urgent cases of marriage in extremis. Canonists do not agree as to whether bishops hold these faculties by virtue of their ordinary power or by general delegation of the law.

Besides the fixed perpetual faculties, bishops also receive from the Holy See habitual temporary indults for a certain period of time or for a limited number of cases. These faculties are granted by fixed "formulæ", in which the Holy See from time to time, or as occasion requires it, makes some slight modifications. Faculties delegated to a bishop in this way do not restrict his ordinary faculties, nor do the faculties issued by one Congregation affect those granted by another. When several specifically different impediments occur in the same case, and one of them exceeds the bishop's powers, he may not dispense from any of them.

Even when the bishop has faculties for each impediment taken separately, he cannot, unless he possesses the faculty known as de cumulo use his various faculties simultaneously in a case where, all the impediments being public, one of them exceeds his ordinary faculties. It is not necessary for a bishop to delegate his faculties to his vicars-general, since 1897 they were always granted to the bishop as ordinary, therefore to the vicar-general as well. With regard to other priests a decree of the holy Office (14 December 1898) declared that, for the future, temporary faculties may be always subdelegated unless the indult expressly states the contrary. These faculties are valid from the date when they were granted in the Roman Curia. In actual practice they do not expire, as a rule, at the death of the pope, nor of the bishop to whom they were given, but pass on to those who take his place (the vicar capitular, the administrator or succeeding bishop). Faculties granted for a fixed period of time, or a limited number of cases, cease when the period or number has been reached, but while awaiting their renewal the bishop, unless culpably negligent, may continue to use them provisionally. A bishop can use his habitual faculties only in favour of his own subjects. The matrimonial discipline of the decree Ne temere (2 August 1907) considers as such all persons having a true canonical domicile, or continuously resident for one month within his territory, and persons who have no domicile anywhere and can claim no continuous stay of one month. When a matrimonial impediment is common to both parties, the bishop, in dispensing his own subject, dispenses also the other.

==== Vicars capitular and vicars-general ====
A vicar capitular, or in his place a lawful administrator, enjoys all the dispensing powers possessed by the bishop in virtue of his ordinary jurisdiction or of delegation of the law. According to the actual discipline he enjoys even the habitual powers which had been granted the deceased bishop for a fixed period of time or for a limited number of cases, even if the indult should have been made out in the name of the Bishop. Considering the actual praxis of the Holy See, the same is true of particular indults (see below). The vicar-general has, by virtue of his appointment, all the ordinary powers of the bishop over prohibent impediments, but requires a special mandate to give him common-law faculties for diriment impediments. As for habitual temporary faculties, since they are now addressed to the ordinary, they belong also to the vicar-general while he holds that office. He can also use particular indults when they are addressed to the ordinary, and when they are not so addressed the bishop can always subdelegate to him, unless the contrary is expressly stated in the indult.

==== Parish priests and other ecclesiastics ====
A parish priest, by common law, can dispense only from an interdict laid on a marriage by him or by his predecessor. Some canonists of note accord him authority to dispense from secret impediments in what are called embarrassing cases, i. e. when there is no time for recourse to the bishop, but with the obligation of subsequent recourse ad cautelam, i. e. for greater security; a similar authority is attributed by them to confessors.

=== Particular indults of dispensation ===
When there is occasion to procure a dispensation that exceeds the powers of the ordinary, or when there are special reasons for direct recourse to the Holy See, procedure is by way of a petition and private rescript. The petition must not necessarily be written by the petitioner, nor even at his instance; it does not, however, become valid until he accepts it. Since the Constitution "Sapienti", all the faithful may have direct recourse to the Roman Congregations, the petition is usually forwarded through the ordinary (of the person's birthplace or domicile, or since the Decree "Ne temere" the residence of one of the petitioners), who transmits it to the proper Congregation; but if there is question of sacramental secrecy, it is sent directly to the Penitentiaria, or handed to the bishop's agent under a sealed cover for transmission to the Penitentiaria. The petition ought to give the names of the petitioners (except in secret cases forwarded to the Penitentiaria), the name of the Ordinary forwarding it, or the name of the priest to whom, in secret cases, the rescript must be sent; the age of the parties, especially in dispensations affecting consanguinity and affinity; their religion, at least when one of them is not a Catholic; the nature, degree and number of all impediments (if recourse is had to the Congregatio de Disciplinâ Sacramentorum or to the Holy Office in a public impediment, and to the Penitentiaria at the same time in a secret one, it is necessary that the latter should know of the public impediment and that recourse has been had to the competent Congregation). The petition must also contain the causes set forth for granting the dispensation and other circumstances specified in the Propaganda Fide Instruction of 9 May 1877. When there is a question of consanguinity in the second degree bordering on the first, the petition should to be written by the bishop's own hand.

==== Declaration of poverty ====
The bishop should also sign the declaration of poverty made by the petitioners when the dispensation is sought from the Penitentiaria in formâ pauperum; when he is in any way hindered from doing so, he is bound to commission a priest to sign it in his name. A false declaration of poverty does not invalidate a dispensation in any case, but the authors of the false statement are bound in conscience to reimburse any amount unduly withheld (regulation for the Roman Curia of 12 June 1908).

==== Reformatory degree ====
When a petition is affected in a material point by obreption or subreption it becomes necessary to ask for a so-called "reformatory decree" in case the favour asked has not yet been granted by the curia, or for the letters known as "Perinde ac valere" if the favour has already been granted. If after all this a further material error is discovered, letters known as "Perinde ac valere super perinde ac valere" must be applied for.

==== Dispensation rescripts ====
Dispensation rescripts are generally drawn up in formâ commissâ mixtâ, i. e. they are entrusted to an executor who is thereby obliged to proceed to their execution, if he finds that the reasons are as alleged (si vera sint exposita). Canonists are divided as to whether rescripts in formâ commissâ mixtâ contain a favour granted from the moment of their being sent off, or to be granted when the execution actually takes place. Gasparri holds it as received practice that it suffices if the reasons alleged are actually true at the moment when the petition is presented. It is certain, however, that the executor required by Penitentiaria rescripts may safely fulfill his mission even if the pope should die before he had begun to execute it. The executor named for public impediments is usually the ordinary who forwards the petition and for secret impediments an approved confessor chosen by the petitioner. Except when specially authorized, the person delegated cannot validly execute a dispensation before he has seen the original of the rescript, which usually prescribes that the reasons given by the petitioners must be verified. This verification, usually no longer a condition for valid execution, can be made, in the case of public impediments, extrajudicially or by subdelegation. In the internal forum it can be made by the confessor in the very act of hearing the confessions of the parties. Should the inquiry disclose no substantial error, the executor proclaims the dispensation, i. e. he makes known, usually in writing, especially if he acts in the external forum, the decree which dispenses the petitioners; if the rescript authorizes him, he also legitimizes the children. Although the executor may subdelegate the preparatory acts, he may not, unless the rescript expressly says so, subdelegate the actual execution of the decree, unless he subdelegates to another ordinary. When the impediment is common to, and known to, both parties, execution ought to be made for both. In a case in the internal forum, the confessor of one of the parties hands over the rescript, after he has executed it, to the confessor of the other. The executor should carefully observe the clauses enumerated in the decree, as some of them constitute conditions sine quâ non for the validity of the dispensation. As a rule, these clauses affecting validity may be recognized by the conditional conjunction or adverb of exclusion with which they begin (e. g. dummodo, "provided that"; et non aliter, "not otherwise"), or by an ablative absolute. When, however, a clause only prescribes a thing already of obligation by law it has merely the force of a reminder. In this matter also it is well to pay attention to the stylus curiœ, i. e. the legal diction of the Roman Congregations and Tribunals, and to consult authors of repute.

=== Causes for granting dispensations ===
Following the principles laid down for dispensations in general, a matrimonial dispensation granted without sufficient cause, even by the pope himself, would be illicit; the more difficult and numerous the impediments the more serious must be the motives for removing them. An unjustified dispensation, even if granted by the pope, is null and void, in a case affecting the Divine law; and if granted by other bishops or superiors in cases affecting ordinary ecclesiastical law. Moreover, as it is unimaginable that the pope wishes to act illicitly, it follows that if he has been moved by false allegations to grant a dispensation, even in a matter of ordinary ecclesiastical law, such a dispensation is invalid. Hence the necessity of distinguishing in dispensations between motive or determining causes (causœ motivœ) and impulsive or merely influencing causes (causœ impulsivœ). Except when the information given is false, still more when he acts spontaneously (motu proprio) and "with certain knowledge", the presumption always is that a superior is acting from just motives. If the pope refuses to grant a dispensation on a certain ground, an inferior prelate, properly authorized to dispense, may grant the dispensation in the same case on other grounds which in his judgment are sufficient. Canonists do not agree as to whether the inferior prelate can grant dispensation on the same ground.

Among the sufficient causes for matrimonial dispensations canonical causes my be distinguished causes, i. e. classified and held as sufficient by the common law and canonical jurisprudence; and reasonable causes, i. e. not provided for nominally in the law, but deserving of equitable consideration in view of circumstances or particular cases. An instruction issued by Propaganda Fide (9 May 1877) enumerated sixteen canonical causes. The "Formulary of the Dataria" (Rome, 1901) gave twenty-eight, which suffice, either alone or concurrently with others, and act as a norm for all sufficient causes. The list of causes is by no means exhaustive; the Holy See, in granting a dispensation, will consider any weighty circumstances that render the dispensation justifiable.

=== Costs of dispensations ===
The Council of Trent (Sess. XXIV, cap. v, De ref. matrim.) decreed that dispensations should be free of all charges. Diocesan chanceries are bound to conform to this law and neither to demand nor accept anything but the modest contribution to the chancery expenses sanctioned by an Instruction approved by Innocent XI on 8 October 1678, and known as the Innocentian Tax (Taxa Innocentiana). Rosset holds that it is also lawful, when the diocese is poor, to demand payment of the expenses it incurs for dispensations. Sometimes the Holy See grants ampler freedom in this matter, but nearly always with the monition that all revenues from this source shall be employed for some good work, and not go to the diocesan curia as such. Henceforth every rescript requiring execution will state the sum which the diocesan curia is authorized to collect for its execution.

In the Roman Curia the expenses incurred by petitioners fall under four categories:

1. expenses (expensae) of carriage (postage, etc.), also a fee to the accredited agent, if one has been employed. This fee is fixed by the Congregation in question;
2. a tax (taxa) to be used in defraying the expenses incurred by the Holy See in the organized administration of dispensations;
3. the componendum, or fine to be paid to the Congregation and applied by it to pious uses;
4. an alms imposed on the petitioners and to be distributed by themselves in good works.

The money paid under the first two categories does not affect, strictly speaking, the gratuity of the dispensation. It constitutes a just compensation for the expenses the petitioners cause the curia. As for the alms and the componendum, besides the fact that they do not profit the pope nor the members of the curia personally, but are employed in pious uses, they are justifiable. Either as a fine for the faults which give occasion for the dispensation, or as a check to restrain the frequency of petitions based on frivolous grounds. The custom of tax and componendum is neither uniform nor universal in the Roman Curia.

== Secular law equivalent ==
Dispensation is the canonical equivalent of license which, according to Black's Law Dictionary, is the authorisation to do something which would normally be illegal if the competent authority had not granted permission.

== See also ==
- Canon law of the Catholic Church
- Casuistry
- Derogation
- Indulgence
