= RCWP =

RCWP may refer to

- Russian Communist Workers Party
- Roman Catholic Women Priests
