= Fresen =

Fresen is a surname. Notable people with the surname include:

- Erik Fresen (born 1976), American politician
- Patricia Fresen (born 1940), South African theologian

== See also ==
- Fresen., standard author abbreviation for Georg Fresenius (1808–1866), German physician and botanist
- Fresens, a municipality in Neuchâtel, Switzerland
