= CORPUS =

CORPUS is an international reformist organization in the Roman Catholic Church. They support allowing married and single people of both sexes to become priests. See Clerical celibacy and Women's ordination.

CORPUS was started in Chicago in 1974 and is one of the oldest Catholic reformist groups in the United States.

Replenishing the vanishing ranks of priests is only one reason to let all priest marry. Compulsory celibacy should end, it is based on the belief that women are inferior, and marriage is a second-rate way of being Christian.

— Father Anthony Padavan, a Catholic priest banished from the priesthood for falling in love and marrying, founder of CORPUS

== See also ==
- Call to Action
- Catholic Church doctrine on the ordination of women
- Leadership Conference of Women Religious
- National Coalition of American Nuns
- Women's Ordination Conference
