= Aviva Kipen =

Australian Reform rabbi

Rabbi Aviva Kipen

Personal life
- Born: c. 1950 Melbourne, Australia

Religious life
- Religion: Judaism
- Denomination: Reform Judaism
- Synagogue: Bentleigh Progressive Synagogue
- Position: Sole rabbi
- Began: 2001
- Ended: 2008

Aviva Kipen (c. 1950) is an Australian Reform rabbi and the first Australian woman (Note: The first woman to serve as a rabbi in Australia was the American-born Karen Soria.) to receive a rabbinic ordination in the Reform stream of Judaism. She became the sole rabbi of the Bentleigh Progressive Synagogue in 2001 before resigning from the congregation in 2008. She has also been a family counselor, theology teacher and a PhD student at the Melbourne College of Divinity. In 2001, she received a Centenary Medal and was inducted into the Victorian Honour Roll of Women.

== Biography ==
Kipen was born in Melbourne, Australia on c. 1950. As a teenager, she was a choir member of her local synagogue, where she was inspired the sermons of one Rabbi Lubofski who "nourished [her] love of Judaism and made it possible, even for the occasional girl, to get some serious scholarship and engage with Jewish issues". When she was 25, she became a primary school teacher and moved to the United States, where she saw women serving as Rabbis for the first time. After applying for Rabbinic studies and completing her M.A. in Rabbinics, she became formally ordained as the first female Australian rabbi at Leo Baeck College in July 1991.
