= Pastor's Initiative =

Dissident Roman Catholic group

Pastor's Initiative (German: Pfarrer-Initiative) is a dissident Roman Catholic group founded in Austria in 2006 by Helmut Schüller as its leader, initiated by an "Appeal to Disobedience", or "Call to Disobedience" (German: Aufruf zum Ungehorsam). Composed of priests with lay support, the group advocates ordination of women, married and non-celibate priesthood, allowing Holy Communion to remarried divorcees and non-Catholics.

== Beliefs ==
Call to Disobedience favors ordination of women, married and non-celibate priesthood, allowing Holy Communion to remarried divorcees and non-Catholics and disagrees with some teachings of the Catholic Magisterium. Schüller believes the Holy Spirit is among the laity, that qualified lay people can preach and give communion in parishes without a priest. The group believes the way the Church is governed needs reform. Schüller has stated:

They [the priests] want to be accepted as the intermediaries between God and the people, yet "Jesus was a layman, and he made no effort to install a clerical class...he encouraged people to confront God on their own. Hence communion is enacted by a parish community and a leader together. While according to current Church doctrine, this leader has to be an ordained priest, there is no reason that it should stay that way." There needs to be a revival of the importance of the parish for the celebration of communion.

== Lecture tour ==
Schüller undertook a lecture tour in the United States in summer 2013. The tour included Boston; Philadelphia; Baltimore; Washington, D.C.; Chicago; Cleveland; Detroit; Cincinnati; Denver; San Diego; Los Angeles; Portland, Oregon; and Seattle. The tour was sponsored by Call to Action, Catholics in Alliance for the Common Good, CORPUS, DignityUSA, FutureChurch, National Coalition of American Nuns, New Ways Ministry, Voice of the Faithful, Quixote Center, and Women's Ordination Conference.

During the tour Schüller expressed concern over his belief that the Church hierarchy ignores the views of the faithful:

The younger generation has, for the most part, already lost patience with these sham battles in dialogues with a Church hierarchy that always knows best – and who have not once given justification for their decisions or non-decisions to the Church base but willingly accept gifts from the faithful.

== Support ==
The movement claims the support of the majority of Austrian Catholic priests and enjoy further support elsewhere:

Fr. Schüller stands with the majority of Catholics who have long supported equality and open dialogue in our Church, the hierarchy has intentionally created an atmosphere of fear and intimidation but the people in the pews are ready to talk about change, with or without the hierarchy's consent.

The group also claims growing membership in other countries.

== Conflict ==
The group is not recognised by any official representatives of the Catholic Church. The group's teaching has been criticised for its deviation from Catholic doctrine.

Pope Benedict XVI criticised the movement several times in his weekly Wednesday audience, describing them as heretics and schismatics. By contrast, its founder, the Rev. Helmut Schüller, blames "absolutist monarchy" and resistance to change by the Vatican for a possible schism.

== See also ==
- Catholic Church in Austria
- Independent Catholic denominations
