= Marla Rosenfeld Barugel =

American singer (born 1956)

Marla Rosenfeld Barugel (born 1956) is, along with Erica Lippitz, one of the first two female hazzans (also called cantors) ordained in Conservative Judaism.

Barugel and Lippitz were ordained in 1987 by the Cantors Institute of the Jewish Theological Seminary in New York City.

In addition to her cantorial education, Barugel earned a BA in French and Spanish and an MS in Secondary Education from the University of Pennsylvania. Prior to her work as a cantor, she worked as a Spanish teacher and a banker. From 1987 until June 2013 she was Cantor of Congregation B'nai Israel in Rumson, New Jersey.

As a cantor, she was a leading force in the struggle for women to be allowed to join the Cantors Assembly, the professional organization of cantors in Conservative Judaism; women were first allowed to join the Cantors Assembly in 1990. She debuted as a soloist in June 1994 in Milwaukee at the Cantors Assembly Convention, and has been a member of the New Jersey Cantors Concert Ensemble since 1987. She has also served on the Executive Council of the Cantors Assembly. Barugel is a founding member of the Cantors Institute Alumni Association.

In 2000, she released a CD titled From Darkness to Light.
