= Pink Smoke over the Vatican =

- Theatrical poster
- Directed by: Jules Hart
- Production company: Eye Goddess Films
- Release date: February 17, 2011 (Berliot Film Festival)
- Country: United States
- Language: English

Pink Smoke over the Vatican is a 2011 documentary film by Jules Hart about women who have been ordained as priests in the Roman Catholic Church, despite the Church regarding this as invalid. The film has won several awards including Best Female Filmmaker and Best Faith-Based Film at the Action On Film International Film Festival; Best Documentary at the Santa Fe Independent Film Festival; and the Emerging Artist Award at Beloit International Film Festival. The film received three Accolade awards: Award of Merit for Feature Documentary; Editing and Voice-over Talent; and an Indie Award of Merit for Feature Documentary. It was also nominated at the Oaxaca Film Fest.

== See also ==
- Christian feminism
- Deaconess
- Episcopa Theodora
- Feminist theology
- Mariavite Church
- Roman Catholic Womenpriests
- We Are Church
- Women as theological figures
- Women in Christianity
- Junia
- Phoebe
