= Margaret Newton Van Cott =

First female Methodist Episcopal evangelist in America

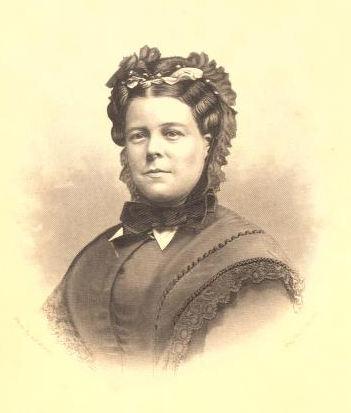
- Margaret Newton Van Cott
- Born: Margaret Ann Newton; March 25, 1830; New York City, U.S.
- Died: August 29, 1914 (aged 84); Catskill, New York, U.S.
- Other names: Maggie Van Cott
- Occupation: Evangelist
- Years active: 1868–1914
- Known for: First female Methodist Episcopal evangelist in America

Margaret Newton Van Cott (March 25, 1830 – August 29, 1914), also known as Margaret Van Cott or Maggie Van Cott, was the first woman to be licensed to preach in the Methodist Episcopal Church.

== Biography ==
Margaret Ann Newton was born in New York City on March 25, 1830. Her father was William K. Newton, a wealthy real estate broker, and her mother was Rachel A. (née Primrose) Newton. She was brought up in the Episcopal Church, the eldest of four children.

In January 1848, Margaret Newton married Peter Van Cott, and in 1852 had two girls, one of whom died in infancy. She was involved with her husband's pharmaceutical business, and when he died she supported the family as a salesperson for a time. Her husband died in 1866 and she joined the Methodist Episcopal Church shortly thereafter. She had a significant conversion experience in which she recounted later "light [from heaven] streaming in upon her soul" while passing the John Street Methodist Church in New York City.

Some time after her husband's death, Maggie Van Cott devoted her full time to evangelical work. She made her first public address in a school in Durham, New York, in 1866. The same year she also led Bible study classes in Five Points, New York at a mission founded by Phoebe Worrall Palmer. Her success led her to be invited to conduct a number of revival meetings in February 1868. She continued to be invited to speak at various locations and received an exhorter's license from the Reverend A. C. Morehouse in September 1868, which allowed her to conduct prayer meetings; this was followed on March 6, 1869, with a local preacher's license in Ellenville, New York. Although there was some opposition to a "lady preacher," she became very popular and successful. In 1872 Bishop Gilbert Haven said "She is without doubt today the most popular, most laborious, and most successful preacher in the Methodist Episcopal Church."

It was said that by her 50th birthday she had traveled 143,417 miles, held 9,933 revival meetings, and given 4,294 sermons. She died at home on August 29, 1914, in Catskill, New York, at eighty-four.
