= Danube Seven =

Group of female Catholic priests

The Danube Seven are a group of seven women from Germany, Austria and the United States who were ordained as priests on a ship cruising the Danube river on 29 June 2002 by Rómulo Antonio Braschi, Ferdinand Regelsberger, and a third unknown bishop.

The seven women are: Christine Mayr-Lumetzberger, Adelinde Theresia Roitinger, Gisela Forster, Iris Muller, Ida Raming, Pia Brunner and Angela White (the last a pseudonym for Dagmar Braun Celeste, the Austrian born former first lady of Ohio in the United States).

Braschi, an Independent Catholic bishop whose own ordination is in the line of apostolic succession and thus considered valid by the Roman Catholic Church, was excommunicated by the latter.

The women's ordinations were not, however, recognized as valid by the Roman Catholic Church, although the women (and their successors) consider their own ordinations to be valid and even studied in a three year program, designed by Christine Mayr-Lumetzberger, prior to their ordinations.

== Legal consequences and responses ==
On 10 July 2002, the Congregation for the Doctrine of the Faith issued a monitum against the women, warning that they would be excommunicated if they did not admit the invalidity of the ordinations and repent. As a consequence of this violation of canon law, specifically canons 1008-1009 and 1024-1025, and their refusal to repent, the Vatican excommunicated the women. The women asked the Vatican to revoke the excommunication, but this request was denied in Decree on the Attempted Ordination of Some Catholic Women.

== See also ==
- Ordination of women in the Catholic Church
- Catholic Apostolic Charismatic Church of Jesus the King
