= Roman Catholic Womenpriests =

Independent Catholic International organization

- Classification: Progressive Christian
- Orientation: Independent Catholic (also claims connection to the Roman Catholic church)
- Scripture: Catholic Bible
- Theology: Catholic theology (partially)
- Separated from: Roman Catholic Church
- Branched from: Roman Catholic Church (claimed)

Roman Catholic Womenpriests (RCWP) is an Independent Catholic international organization that also claims a connection to the Roman Catholic Church. It is descended from the Danube Seven, a group of women who assert that they were ordained as priests in 2002 by Rómulo Antonio Braschi, an Independent Catholic bishop with Apostolic Succession who was excommunicated by the Vatican, and his request for a revocation of the excommunication was denied, in Decree on the Attempted Ordination of Some Catholic Women. According to a book published by the organization, Women Find a Way: The Movement and Stories of Roman Catholic Womenpriests, at least two other unnamed bishops were involved in the ordination. In addition, the RCWP considers these bishops to be in good standing, and the RCWP says the bishops acted in full apostolic succession.

In 2007 the Vatican's Congregation for the Doctrine of the Faith, with the authorization of Pope Benedict XVI, decreed the penalty of automatic excommunication against anyone "who attempts to confer a sacred order on a woman, and the woman who attempts to receive a sacred order".

== Organizational mission ==
The proclaimed mission of Roman Catholic Womenpriests North America is to:

...spiritually prepare, ordain, and support women and men from all states of life, who are theologically qualified, who are committed to an inclusive model of Church, and who are called by the Holy Spirit and their communities to minister within the Roman Catholic Church.

The organization has sponsored numerous ordination ceremonies for women; in response, the Catholic Church has excommunicated or threatened excommunication of all involved, since the Catholic Church teaches that it is impossible to ordain a woman as a deacon, priest, or bishop.

RCWP dissents from what it calls myths or misconceptions about women's role in the Catholic Church and about the exclusion of women from holy orders. It mentions the case of Ludmila Javorová, a Czech woman who worked in the underground church during the Cold War and said she was secretly ordained as a priest, as an instance of female ordination in the modern era.

In response to questions of legitimacy and whether the ordinations are valid or recognized by the Vatican, RCWP states:

The group "RC Womenpriests" receives its authority from Roman Catholic bishops who stand in full Apostolic Succession. These bishops bestowed sacramentally valid ordinations on the women listed above. All the documents pertaining to these ordinations have been attested and notarized. All minutes of the ordinations, including data about persons, Apostolic Succession, and rituals, together with films and photos are deposited with a Notary Public.

Their website claims that "Our ordained women may be married or single, hetero- or homosexual, some are grandmothers, a few are divorced and have had their marriages annulled: we are in fact a cross-section of the Christian community in our lifestyles."

== Vatican response ==
The Catholic Church's canon law bars ordination of women, asserting that "A baptized male (vir) alone receives sacred ordination validly." The Church teaches this as not a matter of changeable discipline, but of divine constitution that it cannot alter. Pope John Paul II wrote in his Apostolic Letter Ordinatio sacerdotalis of 22 May 1994: "We declare that the Church has no authority whatsoever to confer priestly ordination on women and that this judgment is to be held by all the Church's faithful." Therefore, the ordination of a woman to the priesthood, even if conducted by a Catholic bishop in good standing, is, according to the Vatican, without sacramental effect.

== In popular culture ==
The movie Pink Smoke over the Vatican documents female priests, including Roman Catholic Womenpriests.

== See also ==
- Ordination of women
- Ordination of women and the Catholic Church
- Call to Disobedience, organization of male priests who favor women's ordination
- Leadership Conference of Women Religious, a group which proposes women's ordination among other issues
- Women's Ordination Conference
