= Inter Insigniores =

Catholic Church document

Inter Insigniores is a document issued on 15 October 1976 by the Catholic Church's Sacred Congregation for the Doctrine of the Faith with the approval of Pope Paul VI. It presents theological and historical arguments against the Catholic Church's ordination of women as priests and bishops. Its title is taken from the opening words of the document's original Latin text, which mean 'Among the noteworthy'.

Contents:

- Introduction. The Role Of Women In Modern Society And The Church
- 1. The Church's Constant Tradition
- 2. The Attitude of Christ
- 3. The Practice of the Apostles
- 4. Permanent Value of the Attitude of Jesus and the Apostles
- 5. The Ministerial Priesthood in the Light of The Mystery of Christ
- 6. The Ministerial Priesthood Illustrated by The Mystery of the Church
