= Nancy Ledins =

First openly transgender Roman Catholic priest

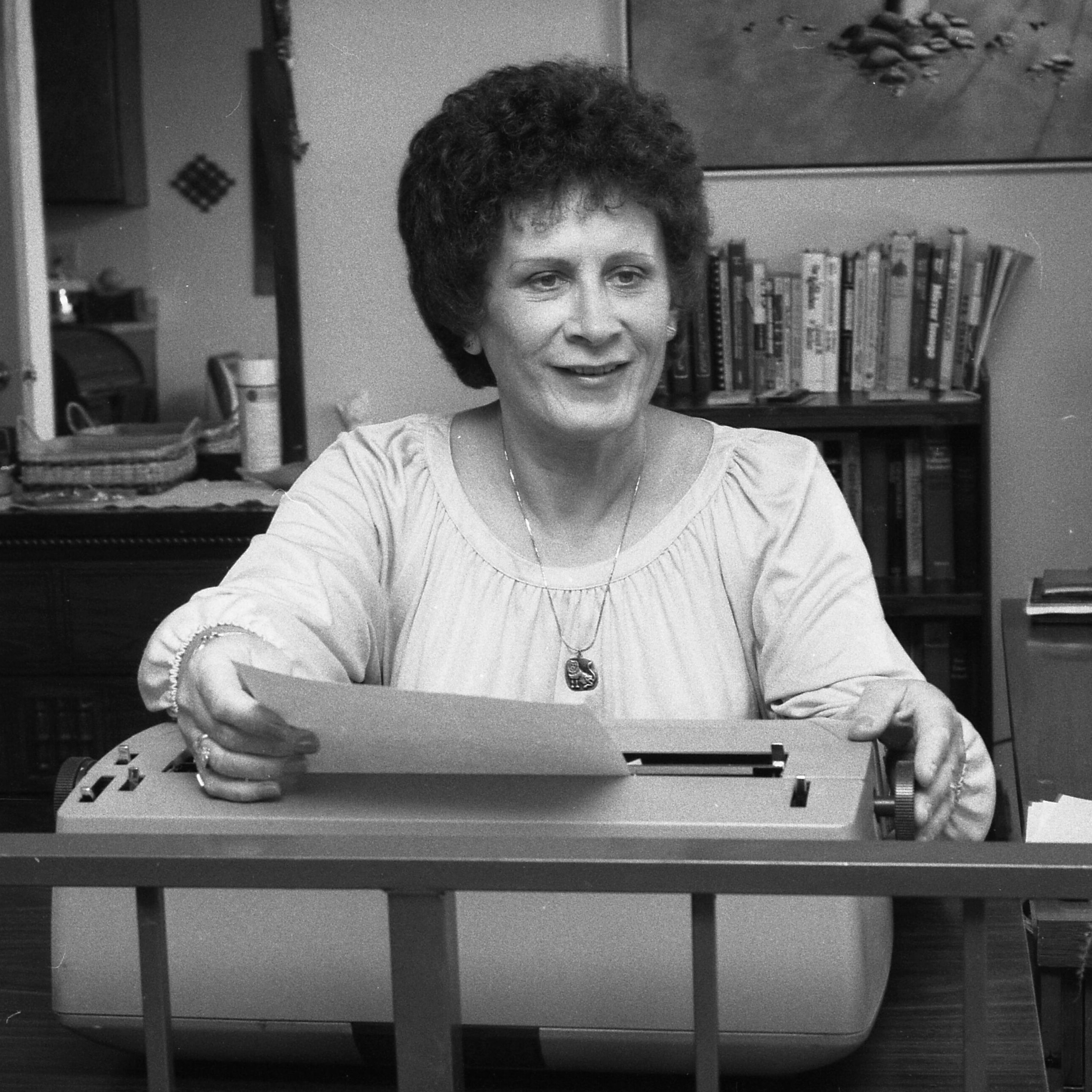
- Nancy Ledins, 1980
- Born: William F. Griglak; July 27, 1932; Cleveland, Ohio, U.S.
- Died: July 18, 2017 (aged 84); Charlotte, North Carolina, U.S.
- Education: Catholic University of America
- Occupations: Priest, psychologist, electrologist

Nancy Ledins (born William F. Griglak; July 27, 1932 – July 18, 2017) was an American Roman Catholic priest who came out as a transgender woman. At the time of her transition she was still considered a priest even after having resigned from official church roles, due to her never being returned to lay status. In this capacity, she is considered by some to be the first official woman priest in the history of the Catholic Church and is the first openly transgender Catholic priest.

== Early life and ministry ==
Ledins was born on July 27, 1932, in Cleveland, Ohio. Presenting as male, she joined the Catholic Missionaries of the Precious Blood and became a priest in 1959. She served as a chaplain for the United States Army in Vietnam during the Vietnam War and served as a priest in Detroit and in Colorado. She earned a PhD in psychology from the Catholic University of America.

== Gender transition ==
Ledins resigned from official church duties in 1969, but was still legally recognized by the Catholic Church as a priest, having not been returned to lay status. In 1970 she married a former nun and moved to Indiana, where she worked as a psychologist in the drug treatment section of the state's Commission on Mental Health. The couple later divorced, which was a requirement in order for a surgeon to perform a gender affirming operation. She received media attention during her gender transition and was considered by some to be the first official woman priest in the Catholic Church. The media attention surrounding transition lead to Ledins being threatened, harassed, sent dead animals in the mail, shot at, and a victim of a car bombing. On April 12, 1979, she underwent gender reassignment surgery in Trinidad, Colorado. When interviewed by the National Catholic Reporter, Ledins stated that she was "technically still ordained" but declined offers to publicly celebrate Mass as Nancy Ledins.

== Later life ==
In 1977 and 1978 she served as the coordinator for the Fantasia Fair.

In 1996 she moved to Charlotte, North Carolina, and joined Wedgewood Church, an LGBT affirming Christian congregation affiliated with American Baptist Churches USA and the United Church of Christ. She served as a minister at Wedgewood, where she preached, sang in the choir, served the Eucharist, and performed baptisms. She also worked as an electrologist and a tax preparer.

Ledins died on July 18, 2017, in North Carolina.
