= Subreption =

Subreption (Latin: subreptio, "the act of stealing", from surripere, "to take away secretly"; German: Erschleichung) is a legal concept in Roman law, in the canon law of the Catholic Church, and in Scots law, as well as a philosophical concept.

== Roman law ==
The term "subreption" originates from Roman law; it was "a late Roman juridical term describing the introduction of false evidence into a legal proceeding".

== Philosophy ==
In German philosophy, the concept of subreption was used by Christian Wolff and Immanuel Kant.

=== Christian Wolff and other German philosophers ===
During the early modern period in Europe, the meaning of "subreption" changed. "[W]riters began to speak of the error of subreption in a more general sense, as opposed to the [Ancient Roman] legal concept of a crime of subreption. Among the German rationalist philosophers who continued to circulate, refine, and redefine the term in the eighteenth century, Christian Wolff stands out as particularly significant for Kant's interest in subreption. Wolff defines the vitium subreptionis as a confusion of 'knowing' (erkennen) with 'experiencing' (erfahren), which we commit whenever we think ourselves to be experiencing something that is merely a product of the intellect. This was the main meaning attached to the term as it was adopted into general scholarly usage in Germany by the middle of the eighteenth century."

=== Kant ===
Kant adopted the term "subreption" in his early work. According to Kant in his Inaugural dissertation, "[w]hen we attach a predicate involving sensible conditions to a concept of the understanding, we must bear in mind that it merely denotes conditions 'in the absence of which a given concept would not be sensitively cognizable'. If we deceive ourselves into thinking the predication has some objective force (that is, that it has anything to say about the conditions of possibility of the object itself), we cross over into subreption. For Kant, the error of subreption is the conflation of a 'sensitive condition, under which alone the intuition of an object is possible' and 'a condition of the possibility itself of the object'". In the same dissertation, an example of subreption for Kant is the axiom "every actual multiplicity can be given numerically, and thus every magnitude is finite"; Kant considers this axiom to be subreptive because the concept of time is introduced surreptitiously as the "means for giving form to the concept of the predicate". This axiom implies the infinity is impossible in itself. Kant argues infinity is not impossible in itself but that infinity is only impossible to imagine for the human mind because the mind relies on sensitive conditions.

== Catholic canon law ==
In the canon law of the Catholic Church, subreption has a specific meaning. Subreption in Catholic Canon law is "a concealment of the pertinent facts in a petition, as for dispensation or favor, that in certain cases nullifies the grant", "the obtainment of a dispensation or gift by concealment of the truth".

== Scots law ==
In Scots law, subreption is "the obtainment of a dispensation or gift by concealment of the truth".
