= Gisela Forster =

Gisela Forster (born 27 March 1946 in Munich) is a German writer, teacher, theologian and independent Catholic bishop.

== Life ==
Forster was born in Munich to parents from Bavaria and Hungary. After school at the Elsa-Brändström-Gymnasium in Munich-Pasing, Forster studied Catholic theology, philosophy, arts and architecture at the Technical University of Munich. After graduating, Forster worked as teacher at the Benedictine Schäftlarn school from 1972 to 1989. In 1989, Forster left the job to marry Anselm Forster, with whom she had two children. She was elected to the district council of Starnberg in 1989, serving as chairman on the council until 2002. Since the 1990s, Forster is working as an art teacher in Munich.

Forster is a member of the German organisation Gruppe Maria Magdala, Priesteramt für die Frau, which promotes priesthood for women. On 29 June 2002, Forster and six others were ordained priests by Independent Catholic Bishop Rómulo Antonio Braschi, a former Roman Catholic bishop from Argentina who left the Roman Catholic Church out of disagreement with the anti-liberation theology stance of the Vatican to join the Catholic Apostolic Charismatic Church of "Jesus the King". In the media, the ordained women were called the Danube Seven because they were ordained on the Danube River near the town of Passau on the border between Germany and Austria. In 2003 the Danube Seven were excommunicated from the Roman Catholic Church. In 2003, she was nonetheless unofficially ordained a bishop, and in conjunction with another woman unofficially ordained bishop, ordained nine women in Canada in 2005.

== Works ==
- Jäckel, Karin; Forster, Gisela (2004). Denn das Weib soll schweigen in der Kirche eine exkommunizierte Priesterin erzählt (in German). Bergisch Gladbach. ISBN 978-3-404-61552-0. OCLC 76617649.
- Ertel, Werner (2002). "Wir sind Priesterinnen" aus aktuellem Anlass: die Weihe von Frauen 2002 (in German). Düsseldorf. ISBN 978-3-491-70363-6. OCLC 76344723.
- Forster, Gisela (2007). Gemeinsam stärker als der Tumor [Dokumentation der Krebserkrankung des 17jährigen Thomas] (in German). Berg. ISBN 978-3-939936-01-5. OCLC 160151945.
- Forster, Gisela (2007). Gedanken sind wie Glut im Wind Gedichte (in German). Berg. ISBN 978-3-939936-04-6. OCLC 160151971.
- Forster, Gisela (2007). Heinrich Kohl : Hitler, mein Idol und Untergang (in German). Berg: Denkzettelverl. ISBN 978-3-939936-05-3. OCLC 219362101.
- Dr. Patricia Fresen – Engagement für Menschlichkeit und Gleichberechtigung. Denkzettelverlag, ISBN 978-3-939936-16-9.
