= Ordinatio sacerdotalis =

1994 apostolic letter by Pope John Paul II

Ordinatio sacerdotalis (English: Priestly ordination) is an apostolic letter issued by Pope John Paul II on 22 May 1994. In this document, John Paul II discussed the Catholic Church's position requiring "the reservation of priestly ordination to men alone" and wrote that "the Church has no authority whatsoever to confer priestly ordination on women". The document states that it was written so "that all doubt may be removed regarding a matter of great importance."

== Content ==
Citing an earlier Vatican document, Inter insigniores, "on the question of the Admission of women to the Ministerial Priesthood", issued by the Congregation for the Doctrine of the Faith in October 1976, Pope John Paul explains the official Roman Catholic understanding that the priesthood is a special role specially set out by Jesus when he chose twelve men out of his group of male and female followers. Pope John Paul notes that Jesus chose the Twelve after a night in prayer (cf. Lk 6:12) and that the Apostles themselves were careful in the choice of their successors. The priesthood is "specifically and intimately associated in the mission of the Incarnate Word himself."

The letter concludes with the words:

Wherefore, in order that all doubt may be removed regarding a matter of great importance, a matter which pertains to the Church's divine constitution itself, in virtue of my ministry of confirming the brethren (cf. Lk 22:32), I declare that the Church has no authority whatsoever to confer priestly ordination on women and that this judgment is to be definitively held by all the Church's faithful. (Note: Ut igitur omne dubium auferatur circa rem magni momenti, quae ad ipsam Ecclesiae divinam constitutionem pertinet, virtute ministerii Nostri confirmandi fratres (Luc. 22, 32), declaramus Ecclesiam facultatem nullatenus habere ordinationem sacerdotalem mulieribus conferendi, hancque sententiam ab omnibus Ecclesiae fidelibus esse definitive tenendam.)

== Magisterial weight ==
The phrase "definitively held by all the Church's faithful" pertains to the full assent of faith that is given to the dogmas of the Catholic Church. Nevertheless, multiple theologians argue that Ordinatio sacerdotalis was not issued under the extraordinary papal magisterium as an ex cathedra statement, and so is not considered infallible in itself.

In a responsum ad dubium (reply to a doubt) explicitly approved by Pope John Paul II and dated October 1995, the Congregation for the Doctrine of the Faith replied that the teaching of Ordinatio sacerdotalis had been "set forth infallibly by the ordinary and universal Magisterium" and accordingly was "to be held definitively, as belonging to the deposit of faith".

In 1998, the Congregation for the Doctrine of the Faith issued another opinion, a doctrinal commentary on Ad tuendam fidem, which said that the teaching of Ordinatio sacerdotalis was not taught as being divinely revealed explicitly, although it might someday be so taught in the future, that is to say, it has not been determined whether the doctrine is "to be considered an intrinsic part of revelation or only a logical consequence", yet in either case it is certainly definitive and to be believed infallibly.
