= Dagmar Braun Celeste =

Former First Lady of Ohio

First Lady of Ohio
- In role January 10, 1983 – January 14, 1991
- Governor: Dick Celeste
- Preceded by: Helen Rhodes
- Succeeded by: Janet Voinovich

Personal details
- Born: Dagmar Ingrid Braun; November 23, 1941 (age 84) Krems an der Donau, Lower Austria, Nazi occupied Austria, Nazi Germany (now Austria)
- Spouse: Dick Celeste (m. 1962; div. 1995)
- Children: 6
- Education: Capital University; Methodist Theological School in Ohio (M.A.)

Dagmar Ingrid Braun Celeste (née Braun; born November 23, 1941) is an American counselor and author. The former first lady of Ohio, she was married to former Ohio governor (1983–1991) and U.S. ambassador Richard F. Celeste, whom she met while attending Oxford University in England. They have six grown children, and were divorced in 1995.

== Early life and education ==
Celeste was born in Krems, Lower Austria, Nazi occupied Austria. She received a bachelor's degree in Women's Studies and Public Policy from Capital University in Ohio in 1982. In 1988, she was granted a master's in Alcoholism and Drug Abuse Ministry at the Methodist Theological School in Delaware, Ohio.

== Politics and social issues ==
Some notable achievements as first lady of Ohio included chairing the Ohio Recovery Council, spearheading the drive to establish the first state-sponsored on-site child care center and Employee Assistance Program in Ohio, initiating the Task Force on Family Violence, co-chairing the Governor's Commission on Volunteerism, and serving as co-chair of the Council on Holocaust Education. She was an Ohio delegate to the Democratic Convention in 1980. Since 1992, she has been active with the National Peace Institute, Women's Action for Nuclear Disarmament, the Council for Ethics in Economics, and the Women's Community Fund in Cleveland.

== Ordination ==
In 2002, Celeste announced that she had secretly been ordained a priest under the pseudonym of "Angela White." She was one of seven women, the "Danube Seven," ordained by Argentinian independent Catholic bishop Rómulo Antonio Braschi on a boat on the Danube River, making her the first female American Catholic to call herself a priest. Celeste was subsequently excommunicated by the Catholic Church, which does not recognize the validity of the ordination of women.

== Other activities ==
Celeste serves as a life balance coach and the executive director of the Tyrian network, "an intentional learning community founded in 2000 on Kelleys Island, Ohio and dedicated to Brigid, both the Goddess and the Saint." She is the author of the auto-biographical book We Can Do Together: Impressions of a Recovering Feminist First Lady. She has also participated in productions of The Vagina Monologues, among others at a Unitarian Universalist Church in 2003.

== Bibliography ==
- We Can Do Together: Impressions of a Recovering Feminist First Lady (Kent State University Press 2002) ISBN 0-87338-718-X.
- “Soli Deo Amor: Story of a Vagabond Troubadour,” in Women Find a Way: the Movement and Stories of Roman Catholic WomenPriests; edited by Elsie Hainz McGrath, Bridget Mary Meehan & Ida Raming; ISBN 978-1-60264-223-2.
- Making Waves, a play / oral history project by Kay Eaton and Cece Miller of Sacred Space in Cleveland, OH, includes a reading of the career of Dagmar Celeste
