= Karen Soria =

American-born rabbi and chaplain, first woman rabbi in Australia

Karen Soria is an American-born rabbi. She became the first female rabbi to serve in Australia when she joined the rabbinical team at Temple Beth Israel, a progressive Reform Jewish synagogue in Melbourne, in the 1980s. She later served as a chaplain for the U.S. Marines and the U.S. Navy; she was the first woman rabbi to serve in this capacity for the Marines, and the second in the Navy. After moving to Canada, she became the first woman rabbi to serve as a chaplain with the Canadian Forces.

== Early life and education ==
Karen Soria was born and raised near Chicago, Illinois. Deciding to pursue rabbinical training, she attended the HUC-JIR Reform Jewish seminary, in Cincinnati, Ohio. After receiving her Master of Arts in Hebrew Letters in 1981, she became ordained as a rabbi. At the time, there were very few women rabbis in the United States.

== Career ==
After her ordination, Soria moved to Australia, where she served as an assistant rabbi at Temple Beth Israel in Melbourne. In taking this post, she became the first woman rabbi in Australia. Soria remained in Australia from 1981 to 1989. During this time she was the Chair of the Progressive Council of Rabbi's of Australia and New Zealand. Soria's work as a rabbi in Australia helped open doors for other women to follow. One of her first activities was to launch a reading group for women interested in studying Jewish texts; she would create several such groups over the course of her career. The first Australian-born woman rabbi, Aviva Kipen, was ordained ten years after Soria, in 1991.

When Soria left Australia, she moved to Florida in the United States, where she served two congregations: Congregation Beth Shalom and Bat Yam/Temple of the Islands. She then decided to enlist as a chaplain in the United States Navy. Only the second woman rabbi ever to serve in the Navy Chaplain Corps, she held this post from 1992 to 2003. She also became the first female rabbi to serve with the United States Marine Corps, which she did from 1992 until 1996.

Soria moved to Canada in 2003. In 2008, she began serving part-time as a rabbi at Temple Shalom in Winnipeg, Manitoba; she combined this with part-time work as a chaplain at the Health Sciences Center. The following year, in 2009, Soria became the first female rabbi in the Canadian Forces; she was assigned to 3 Canadian Forces Flying Training School in Portage la Prairie, Manitoba.

Soria has also served as rabbi of Beth Israel Congregation in Kingston, Ontario.

== Awards and honors ==
Soria is a two-time recipient of the Navy and Marine Corps Achievement Medal, a military decoration, which was awarded to her in 1997 and 2001.

In 2011 HUC-JIR awarded her an honorary Doctor of Divinity degree.

== See also ==
- Timeline of women rabbis
- Women in Judaism
- Judaism in Australia
- Judaism in Canada
