= Christine Mayr-Lumetzberger =

Christine Mayr-Lumetzberger (born 1956) is a teacher and former Benedictine nun who was excommunicated from the Roman Catholic Church when she and six others were ordained as priests by an Independent Catholic bishop in 2002. She claims she was ordained a bishop in 2003 along with Gisela Forster; reportedly, the ordination was performed by Roman Catholic bishops whose identity remains a secret.

She has declared as her motive to promote the ordination of women within the Roman Catholic Church which does not recognize the ordination of women as valid: "A baptized male alone receives sacred ordination validly". In 1994, Pope John Paul II declared in the apostolic letter Ordinatio sacerdotalis that "the Church has no authority whatsoever to confer priestly ordination on women".

== Early life ==
Mayr-Lumetzberger was born in Linz, Austria. She grew up in Linz with religious parents and attended a Roman Catholic school run by the Holy Cross Sisters. Though she and her parents did not always see eye-to-eye, she was very active in her local parish. When she was 14, she was allowed to serve in her local parish as an altar server, though she was not allowed to wear a surplice. Women or girls serving at the Eucharist was against liturgical regulations at the time, but has since become permissible.

== Convent period ==
After leaving school, Mayr-Lumetzberger left to join the convent of the Benedictines of the Immaculate Heart of Mary in Steinerkirchen and was given the religious name of "Marie Christin". Though she wanted to study theology, after her initial two years in the convent, she was instead sent back to Linz to study to become a religion teacher. During her final year of study, she was working at a school for special needs children where she met a divorcee whom she fell in love with. After completing her studies, she left religious life without dispensation and married him in a non-Catholic ceremony. As such, her marriage is not recognized by the Catholic Church. Because she had abandoned the convent and married a divorced man, she was unable to find subsequent work with the Church.

== Teaching career ==
In her professional life, Mayr-Lumetzberger eventually got a job training kindergarten teachers and then as a teacher in a special education school. Though she was in some ways outcast, she continued to be active in her local parish and with volunteer work. It was at this time that she began to perform liturgies and to volunteer as a priest at the local hospital and for those that wanted her services. Gradually, she became bolder and, although she was not an ordained minister, she began to celebrate Mass with friends and perform other priestly functions.

== Ordination ==
On 29 June 2002, Mayr-Lumetzberger and six others were ordained priests by Independent Catholic Bishop Rómulo Antonio Braschi, a former Roman Catholic bishop from Argentina who left the Roman Catholic Church out of disagreement with the anti-liberation theology of the Vatican to join the Catholic Apostolic Charismatic Church of Jesus the King. In the media, the ordained women were called the Danube Seven because they were ordained on the Danube River near the town of Passau on the border between Germany and Austria. On 21 December 2002, after refusing to acknowledge the Vatican decree declaring these ordinations void, she and the others incurred excommunication.

In 2003, Mayr-Lumetzberger was ordained a bishop at a secret ceremony, with the identity of the ordaining bishop remaining a secret. She subsequently ordained several other women as priests, including an ordination of women from the United States and Canada on the St. Lawrence River in 2005 and a female bishop in Indiana. These ordinations are not recognized by the Roman Catholic Church. Many Independent Catholic jurisdictions would not consider their ordinations unique as they have been ordaining Catholic women as priests since at least the 1990s.

At a Sunday Mass on 28 June 2009, Mayr-Lumetzberger was refused communion by Bishop Ludwig Schwarz at the Parish of St. Peter in Linz because of her excommunication. She came dressed as a bishop and was advised by Schwarz not to come to receive Communion but she did so, herself taking a Host from the ciborium.

As of 2022, she still holds Mass.
