= Vetitum =

Concept in Catholic marriage law

In the canon law of the Catholic Church, a vetitum (Latin for "a prohibited thing") is a prohibition, in the form of a precept, imposed by an ecclesiastical judge on a particular individual, in connection with declaring the nullity of marriage, that prevents them from contracting another marriage, at least until the cause of the nullity of the first marriage has ceased. A vetitum prohibits marriage in the Catholic Church until the prohibition is removed.

The term describes a prohibition against a particular behavior or action that is affixed to a party whose marriage was declared found to have been null in a declaration of nullity from a matrimonial tribunal of the Catholic Church. This prohibition or directive may involve one or both of the parties. A vetitum is imposed to delay the celebration of a future marriage until a given condition has been fulfilled or addressed. Thus, the pastoral purpose of a vetitum is to help an individual and/or a couple address the underlying problems that led to the breakdown of a former marriage union. At times a recommendation or a warning (a monitum) may also be made by the tribunal which processes a formal petition for nullity.
