= Erica Lippitz =

Erica Jan (Riki) Lippitz and Marla Rosenfeld Barugel were the first two female hazzans (also called cantors) ordained in Conservative Judaism. Their ordination was held in 1987, two years after the first woman was ordained a Conservative rabbi.

Lippitz and Barugel were ordained at the same time by the Cantors Institute of the Jewish Theological Seminary in New York City. After her ordination, Lippitz served for 34 years as cantor of Oheb Shalom in South Orange, New Jersey. She was also the director and co-founder of the Kol Dodi choir, director of Oheb Shalom's adult and children's choirs, and a member of the folk-singing group Beged Kefet, which performs nationally and has made three recordings. She was a cofounder, with Cantor Perry Fine, of the JTS Cantorial Alumni Association's Shir Joy Choral Festival. In 2005 she sang at Carnegie Hall.

Prior to becoming a cantor, Lippitz earned a B.A. from the University of Michigan, as well as a Masters in Jewish Communal Service from Brandeis University. She had also served as the director of Loyola University Chicago's Hillel. When she entered the Seminary, she did not believe graduating as a Hazzan would be possible. By the time she graduated, she was one of eleven accomplished women in the program, all of whom went on to serve congregations of note.

Cantor Lippitz was recognized numerous times by the Cantors Assembly of the Conservative movement, receiving the Yehudah Mandel Humanitarian Award (2013), the Hazzan Moshe Nathanson Award for Conducting (2018), and the Yuval Award (2018).
