= Ida Raming =

German author, teacher and Catholic theologian

Ida Raming (born 10 August 1932 in Fürstenau, Germany) is a German author, teacher, theologian and independent Catholic priest.

== Life ==
After school Raming studied Catholic theology, German and pedagogy at the University of Münster and the University of Freiburg. She finished university in 1973 and worked as a teacher at Gymnasium Martinum Emsdetten in Germany. She wrote several books concerning women's rights in the Roman Catholic Church.

On 29 June 2002, Raming and six other women were ordained priests by Independent Catholic bishop Rómulo Antonio Braschi, a former Roman Catholic priest from Argentina who left the Roman Catholic Church out of disagreement with the anti-liberation theology of the Vatican to join the Catholic Apostolic Charismatic Church of Jesus the King. In the media, the ordained women were called the Danube Seven because they were ordained on the Danube River near the town of Passau on the border between Germany and Austria. In 2003 Raming was excommunicated from the Roman Catholic Church.

Raming, who in 1986 had co-founded Gruppe Maria Magdala, Priesteramt für die Frau, which promotes priesthood for women, indicated that her personal experience of misogynistic religious restrictions including the exclusion of women from ordained offices was the impetus behind her actions.

== Works ==
- 2007: Unser Leben im Einsatz für Menschenrechte der Frauen in der römisch-katholischen Kirche. Lit, Berlin/Münster, ISBN 978-3-8258-0186-1 (together with Iris Müller).
- 2006: Gleichrangig in Christus anstatt: Ausschluss von Frauen „im Namen Gottes“. Lit, Berlin/Münster, ISBN 978-3-8258-9706-2.
- 2002: Priesteramt der Frau: Geschenk Gottes für eine erneuerte Kirche. Lit, Münster/Hamburg/London, ISBN 3-8258-5579-1. Erweiterte Neuauflage von „Der Ausschluß der Frau vom Priesterlichen Amt“ (1973) with bibliography (1974–2001)
- 1998: Aufbruch aus männlichen „Gottesordnungen“: Reformbestrebungen von Frauen in christlichen Kirchen und im Islam. Deutscher Studien-Verlag, Weinheim, ISBN 3-89271-796-6.
- 1998: Zur Priesterin berufen. Thaur, Thaur/Wien/Munich, ISBN 3-85400-070-7 (as editor).
- 1989: Frauenbewegung und Kirche: Bilanz eines 25jährigen Kampfes für Gleichberechtigung und Befreiung der Frau seit dem 2. Vatikanischen Konzil. Studien-Verlag, Weinheim, ISBN 3-89271-148-8.
- 1973: Der Ausschluss der Frau vom priesterlichen Amt: Gottgewollte Tradition oder Diskriminierung? eine rechtshistorisch-dogmatische Untersuchung der Grundlagen von Kanon 968, § 1 d. Codex Iuris Canonici. Böhlau, Cologne/Wien, ISBN 3-412-83073-9 (dissertation).
