= Ordination of women and the Catholic Church =

In the liturgical traditions of the Catholic Church, the term ordination refers to the means by which a person is included in one of the holy orders of bishops, priests, or deacons. The teaching of the Catholic Church on ordination, as expressed in the 1983 Code of Canon Law, the Catechism of the Catholic Church, and Ordinatio sacerdotalis (an apostolic letter), is that only a Catholic male validly receives ordination (ex opere operato), and "that the Church has no authority whatsoever to confer priestly ordination on women and that this judgment is to be definitively held by all the Church's faithful." In other words, the male priesthood is not considered by the church a matter of policy, but an unalterable requirement of God. As with priests and bishops, the church ordains only men as deacons.

== History ==
=== Early Church ===
References are made within the earliest Christian communities to the role of women in positions of church leadership. Paul's letter to the Romans, written in the first century, commends Phoebe who is described as "deaconess of the church at Cenchreae" that she be received "in the Lord as befits the saints, and help her in whatever she may require from you, for she has been a helper of many and of myself as well." In the same chapter, Paul greets a number of women prominent within the church as "co-workers in Christ Jesus", including Priscilla, who hosted a house church with her husband, and Junia, who Paul appears to identify as an apostle.

In AD 494, in response to reports that women were serving at the altar in the south of Italy, Pope Gelasius I wrote a letter condemning female participation in the celebration of the Eucharist, arguing that those roles were exclusively reserved for men. However, its meaning and significance are not absolutely clear. Because of several textual ambiguities and silences, the letter is open to more than one interpretation. Not surprisingly, scholars have been polarized about its meaning. Roger Gryson asserts that it is "difficult to form an idea of the situation which Pope Gelasius opposed" and observes that "it is regrettable that more details" about the situation are not available.

In the church of Santa Prassede in Rome, "Theodora Episcopa"—episcopa being the Latin for "bishop" but in feminine form—appears in an image with two female saints and the Virgin Mary. Ecclesiastical tradition explains that this Theodora was mother of Pope Paschal I, who paid for the church. Per Eisen Ute, the use of a title usually reserved for a consecrated Roman bishop could therefore be seen as honorific, rather than suggesting that she herself undertook a leadership role, or it could be a later addition. The use of the feminine title episcopa or presbytera has however been traditionally reserved for the wife or widow of Christian clergy since the Apostolic Age, according to the Catholic Church, Eastern Orthodox Church, and Oriental Orthodox Churches.

=== Church Fathers ===
Many Church Fathers did not advocate for or permit the ordination of women. Clement of Rome taught that the apostles chose only men to succeed them. The First Council of Nicaea—the first ecumenical council—subsequently decreed that deaconesses were not ordained ministers because they did not receive the laying on of hands and were to be considered lay persons.

Concerning the "constant practice of the Church", in antiquity the Church Fathers Irenaeus, Tertullian, Hippolytus, Epiphanius, John Chrysostom, and Augustine all wrote that the priestly ordination of women was impossible. The Council of Laodicea prohibited ordaining women to the presbyterate, although the meaning of Canon 11 has received very different interpretations as to whether it refers to senior deaconesses or older women presiding over the female portion of the congregation. In the period between the Reformation and the Second Vatican Council, mainstream theologians continued to oppose the priestly ordination of women, appealing to a mixture of scripture, church tradition and natural law. (Note: Some translated extracts from contemporary theological textbooks are given at religiousstudiesblog.blogspot.com.)

=== Ecumenical councils ===
Ecumenical councils, according to the church, are a part of the universal and extraordinary magisterium, making their canons and decrees infallible insofar as they are about the Catholic faith and morals. Canon 19 of the First Council of Nicaea (325 CE) declared deaconesses to be laywomen:

Like treatment should be given in the case of their deaconesses, and generally in the case of those who have been enrolled among their clergy. We mean by 'deaconesses' those who have assumed the habit, but who, since they have not had hands laid upon them, are to be numbered only among the laity.

Canon 15 of the Council of Chalcedon (451 CE) declared that deaconesses are ordained and must practice celibacy after ordination:

No woman under forty years of age is to be ordained a deacon, and then only after close scrutiny. If after receiving ordination and spending some time in the ministry she despises God's grace and gets married, such a person is to be anathematised along with her spouse.

== Church teaching ==
=== Requirements of holy orders ===
While the church believes Christians have the right to receive the sacraments, the church does not believe in a right to ordination. The church believes the sacraments work ex opere operato as manifestations of Jesus' actions and words during his life, and that according to dogma Jesus only chose certain men as apostles. The church teaches that a woman's impediment to ordination is diriment, of divine law, public, absolute, and permanent because Jesus instituted ordination by ordaining the twelve apostles, since holy orders is a manifestation of Jesus' calling of the apostles.

=== 1976 declaration on the ordination of women ===
In 1976, the Congregation for the Doctrine of the Faith issued the Declaration on the Question of the Admission of Women to the Ministerial Priesthood which taught that for doctrinal, theological, and historical reasons, the Church "does not consider herself authorized to admit women to priestly ordination." Reasons given were the Church's determination to remain faithful to its constant tradition, its fidelity to Christ's will, and the iconic value of male representation due to the "sacramental nature" of the priesthood. The Church teaching on the restriction of its ordination to men is that masculinity was integral to the personhood of both Jesus and the men he called as apostles. The Church sees maleness and femaleness as two different ways of expressing common humanity (essence).

=== Ordinatio sacerdotalis ===
On May 22, 1994, John Paul II promulgated Ordinatio sacerdotalis, where he states that the Church cannot confer priestly ordination on women:

Wherefore, in order that all doubt may be removed regarding a matter of great importance, a matter which pertains to the Church's divine constitution itself, in virtue of my ministry of confirming the brethren (cf. Lk 22:32) I declare that the Church has no authority whatsoever to confer priestly ordination on women and that this judgment is to be definitively held by all the Church's faithful.

Pope John Paul II explains the Catholic understanding that the priesthood is a role specially set out by Jesus when he called twelve men out of his group of male and female followers. John Paul says that Jesus chose the Twelve after a night in prayer and that the Apostles themselves were careful in the choice of their successors. The priesthood is "specifically and intimately associated in the mission of the Incarnate Word himself."

Pope Paul VI, quoted by John Paul in Ordinatio sacerdotalis, wrote, "The Church holds that it is not admissible to ordain women to the priesthood, for very fundamental reasons. These reasons include: the example recorded in the Sacred Scriptures of Christ choosing his Apostles only from among men; the constant practice of the Church, which has imitated Christ in choosing only men; and her living teaching authority which has consistently held that the exclusion of women from the priesthood is in accordance with God's plan for his Church."

==== Response of the Congregation for the Doctrine of the Faith ====
On October 28, 1995, in a responsa to a dubium concerning Ordinatio sacerdotalis, the Congregation for the Doctrine of the Faith said:

Dubium: Whether the teaching that the Church has no authority whatsoever to confer priestly ordination on women, which is presented in the Apostolic Letter Ordinatio sacerdotalis to be held definitively, is to be understood as belonging to the deposit of faith. Responsum: Affirmative. This teaching requires definitive assent, since, founded on the written Word of God, and from the beginning constantly preserved and applied in the Tradition of the Church, it has been set forth infallibly by the ordinary and universal Magisterium (cf. Second Vatican Council, Dogmatic Constitution on the Church Lumen Gentium 25, 2). Thus, in the present circumstances, the Roman Pontiff, exercising his proper office of confirming the brethren (cf. Lk 22:32), has handed on this same teaching by a formal declaration, explicitly stating what is to be held always, everywhere, and by all, as belonging to the deposit of the faith.

=== Doctrinal commentary on Ad tuendam fidem ===
On July 15, 1998, the Congregation for the Doctrine of the Faith issued a doctrinal commentary on Ad tuendam fidem. In it, the congregation gave examples of Catholic doctrines owed the full assent of faith, including the reservation of ordination to men only:

A similar process can be observed in the more recent teaching regarding the doctrine that priestly ordination is reserved only to men. The Supreme Pontiff, while not wishing to proceed to a dogmatic definition, intended to reaffirm that this doctrine is to be held definitively, since, founded on the written Word of God, constantly preserved and applied in the Tradition of the Church, it has been set forth infallibly by the ordinary and universal Magisterium. As the prior example illustrates, this does not foreclose the possibility that, in the future, the consciousness of the Church might progress to the point where this teaching could be defined as a doctrine to be believed as divinely revealed.

=== Decree on the Attempted Ordination of Some Catholic Women ===
On December 2, 2002, the Congregation for the Doctrine of the Faith issued the Decree on the Attempted Ordination of Some Catholic Women. In it, the congregation states that the doctrine of ordination was definitively proposed by John Paul II in Ordinatio sacerdotalis:

In addition there is the doctrinal aspect, namely, that they formally and obstinately reject a doctrine which the church has always taught and lived, and which was definitively proposed by Pope John Paul II, namely, 'that the church has no authority whatsoever to confer priestly ordination on women' (Ordinatio sacerdotalis, 4). The denial of this doctrine is rightly considered the denial of a truth that pertains to the Catholic faith and therefore deserves a just penalty (cf. Canons 750 §2; 1372, n. 1; John Paul II, Ad Tuendam Fidem, 4A).

The congregation further stated that to deny the dogma is to oppose the magisterium of the Pope:

Moreover, by denying this doctrine, the persons in question maintain that the magisterium of the Roman Pontiff would be binding only if it were based on a decision of the college of bishops, supported by the sensus fidelium and received by the major theologians. In such a way they are at odds with the doctrine on the magisterium of the successor of Peter, put forward by both the First and Second Vatican Councils, and they thereby fail to recognize that the teachings of the supreme pontiff on doctrines to be held definitively by all the faithful are irreformable.

=== Catechism ===
The Catechism of the Catholic Church, promulgated by John Paul II on August 15, 1997, states that the church is bound by Jesus' choice of apostles:

The Lord Jesus chose men (viri) to form the college of the twelve apostles...The Church recognizes herself to be bound by this choice made by the Lord himself. For this reason the ordination of women is not possible.

=== 2008 excommunication order ===
The Vatican's Congregation for the Doctrine of the Faith issued and published on May 29, 2008, in the Vatican newspaper L'Osservatore Romano, a decree signed by Cardinal William Levada determining that women "priests" and the bishops who attempt to ordain them would incur excommunication latae sententiae.

=== Pope Francis ===
Pope Francis said in a 2013 interview that regarding women's priestly ordination, "with reference to the ordination of women, the Church has spoken and says, 'No.' John Paul II said it, but with a definitive formulation. That is closed, that door." He later expanded on this in a November 2016 informal statement on the return flight from his papal visit to Sweden to commemorate the Reformation: "On the ordination of women in the Catholic Church, the final word is clear, it was said by St. John Paul II and this remains." Francis added that women are very important to the church, specifically from a "Marian dimension. In Catholic ecclesiology there are two dimensions to think about [...] The Petrine dimension, which is from the Apostle Peter, and the Apostolic College, which is the pastoral activity of the bishops, as well as the Marian dimension, which is the feminine dimension of the Church."

== Ordination to the diaconate ==
In contrast to the ordination of women to the Catholic priesthood, the ordination of women to the diaconate is being actively discussed by Catholic scholars, and theologians, as well as senior clergy. No dogma exists against ordaining women to the diaconate. Paragraph 60 of the Final Document of the Second Session of the XVI Ordinary General Assembly of the Synod of Bishops has made it magisterial teaching that the discernment about women's diaconal ministry remains open and should continue.

The historical evidence points to women serving in ordained roles from its earliest days in both the Western Church as well as the Eastern Church. Jean Morin, an Oratorian priest, produced a study determining that some women's deaconal ordinations met the criteria for true ordination according to the Council of Trent. Writers such as Martimort contend they did not. Monastic female deacons in the East received the stole as a symbol of their office at ordination, which took place inside the sanctuary. The Maronite Church determined during the 1736 Synod of Mount Lebanon that women can be ordained deacons, in 1746 its canons were approved by Pope Benedict XIV. The First Council of Nicaea (325) stated that deaconesses of heretical sects "do not receive any imposition of hands, so that they are in all respects to be numbered among the laity." The later Council of Chalcedon (451) decreed "A woman shall not receive the laying on of hands as a deaconess under forty years of age, and then only after searching examination." Gryson argues that the use of the verb cheirotonein and of the substantive cheirothesia clearly indicate that women deacons were ordained by the laying on of hands. Apostolic Constitutions (circa 380) in Book VIII state that a deaconess is ordained by the bishop with laying of the hands. An eighth-century Byzantine ordination rite for women deacons included epiclesis. Women ceased to function as deacons in the West in the 13th century.

In the past century, K. K. Fitzgerald, Phyllis Zagano, and Gary Macy have argued for the sacramental ordination of women as deacons. Jean Daniélou wrote in favor of the ordained female diaconate in a 1960 article in La Maison-Dieu.

The Second Vatican Council in the 1960s revived the permanent diaconate, raising the question of female engagement from a purely theoretical matter to one with practical consequences. Based on the idea that women deacons received and are capable of receiving the sacrament of holy orders, there have been continued modern-day proposals to ordain permanent women deacons, who would perform the same functions as male deacons and be like them in every respect. In 1975 the German Roman Catholic Episcopal Synod in Würzburg voted in favor of ordaining women deacons. The Congregation for the Doctrine of the Faith in Rome indicated it was open to the idea and ruled in 1977 that the possibility of ordaining women as deacons was "a question that must be taken up fully by direct study of the texts, without preconceived ideas." The International Theological Commission looked at the issue in the 1990s; its 1997 report was not published, and a later report was approved for publication by Joseph Ratzinger in 2002. The second, longer report indicated that the matter is one for the Magisterium to decide.

In 2015, Archbishop Paul-André Durocher of Gatineau, Canada, called for the restoration of women to the diaconate at the Synod of Bishops on the Family. In 2016, Pope Francis formerly established a Commission to study the ministry of deaconesses in the Early Church, exploring their roles, the rites they participated in, and the formulas employed to designate them as deaconesses. The "Study Commission on the Women's Diaconate" included twelve scholars under the presidency of Cardinal Luis Ladaria Ferrer. The first meetings were held in Rome. In 2018, Pope Francis indicated that there had been as yet no conclusive decisions but that he was not afraid of ongoing studies. Finally in January 2019, two of its members confirmed that a report had been formally submitted. In October 2019, Members of the Synod of Bishops for the Amazon asked that women be given leadership roles in the Catholic Church, although they stopped short of calling for female deacons., but there were many bishops also, who voted by 137 to 30 in favor of female deacons.

In January 2020, the president of the International Union of Superiors General (UISG), which had asked Pope Francis to create a Commission to study women deacons, affirmed that they received a section on history of the original Commission report.

In February 2020, Pope Francis seemed to reject the possibility of ordaining married deacons as priests and put aside the question of women deacons in the immediate term. On April 8, 2020, he initiated a new ten-person commission to consider the issue. Many members were known to support the concept of restoring women to the ordained diaconate. The report of this commission, released in 2025 at the request of pope Leo XIV, rejected the possibility of ordaining women to the diaconate "as a degree of Holy Orders", while not stating a definitive judgment at that time.

== Ordination and equality ==
The Catholic Church states that the ministerial priesthood is ordered to service for all of the baptized faithful.

In Mulieris dignitatem, Pope John Paul II wrote, "In calling only men as his Apostles, Christ acted in a completely free and sovereign manner. In doing so, he exercised the same freedom with which, in all his behavior, he emphasized the dignity and the vocation of women, without conforming to the prevailing customs and to the traditions sanctioned by the legislation of the time."

In Ordinatio sacerdotalis, John Paul II wrote: "the fact that the Blessed Virgin Mary, Mother of God and Mother of the Church, received neither the mission proper to the Apostles nor the ministerial priesthood clearly shows that the non-admission of women to priestly ordination cannot mean that women are of lesser dignity, nor can it be construed as discrimination against them. Rather, it is to be seen as the faithful observance of a plan to be ascribed to the wisdom of the Lord of the universe."

The Catholic Church does not regard the priest as the only possible prayer leader, and prayer may be led by a woman. For example, when no priest, deacon, instituted lector or instituted acolyte is available, lay people (either men and women) may be appointed by the pastor to celebrate a Liturgy of the Word and distribute Holy Communion (which must be consecrated beforehand by a priest). During these liturgies, a layperson is to act as "one among equals" and avoid formulas or rites which are proper to ordained ministers.

Religious life is a distinct vocation in itself, and women live in consecrated life as a nun or religious sister, and throughout the history of the Church it has not been uncommon for an abbess to head a dual monastery, i.e., a community of men and women. Women today exercise many roles in the Church. They run catechetical programs in parishes, provide spiritual direction, serve as lectors and extraordinary ministers of Holy Communion, and teach theology. In 1994, the Congregation for Divine Worship and the Discipline of the Sacraments interpreted the 1983 Code of Canon Law to permit girls and women to assist at Mass as altar servers. Still many people see the Church's position on the ordination of women as a sign that women are not equal to men in the Catholic Church, though the Church rejects this inference. On January 11, 2021, with the Apostolic Letter Spiritus Domini, Pope Francis modified Canon 230.1 to allow both men and women to be formally installed as lectors and acolytes.

== Dissenting views ==
When Pew Research polled Americans in 2015, 59 percent of those who self-identified as Catholic believed that the church should ordain women.

=== Organizations ===
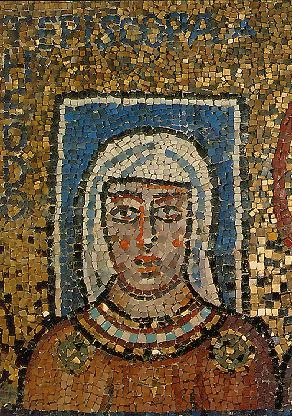
The mother of Pope Paschal I, the Lady Theodora, is suggested by some scholars to have been a bishop in the Catholic Church.

There is at least one organization that, without Church authority, calls itself "Roman Catholic" that ordains women as priests at the present time, Roman Catholic Womenpriests; and several independent Catholic jurisdictions have been ordaining women in the United States since approximately the late 1990s. These organizations are independent of, and unrecognised by, the Roman Catholic Church. Since 2002, Womenpriests has conducted ordination ceremonies for women to become deacons, priests and bishops, saying that these ordinations are valid because the initial ordinations were conferred by a validly ordained Catholic male bishop (Romulo Antonio Braschi, who left the Catholic Church in 1975) and therefore they are in the line of apostolic succession. They cite Primacy of Conscience. However, the Catholic Church considers these ordinations to be invalid, and decreed excommunications for those involved in the ceremonies.

On April 19, 2009, Womenpriests elected four bishops to serve the United States: Joan Mary Clark Houk, Andrea Michele Johnson, Maria Regina Nicolosi, and Bridget Mary Meehan. The Vatican's Congregation for the Doctrine of the Faith had issued a decree in 2008 declaring such "attempted ordinations" invalid and that, since canons 1378 and 1443 apply to those who participate in these ceremonies, all were excommunicated. Edward Peters, a doctor of canon law, explains that their excommunication results in virtue of a combination of other canons which arise from application of Canons 1378 and 1443. In response, The objections listed in the decrees of excommunication regard the illegality of the ordinations. Womenpriests said its members are "loyal member of the church who stand in the prophetic tradition of holy disobedience to an unjust law."

Womenpriests interprets the works of certain Catholic scholars (for example, former minister John Wijngaards, liturgical reformist Robert W. Hovda, and theologian Damien Casey) to say that they have doctrinal support for the ordination of women.

Women's Ordination Worldwide, founded in 1996 in Austria, is a network of twelve national and international groups whose primary mission is the admission of Catholic women to all ordained ministries. Members include Catholic Women's Ordination (founded in March 1993 in the United Kingdom), Roman Catholic Womenpriests (founded in 2002 in America), Women's Ordination Conference (founded in 1975 in America) and others. The first recorded Catholic organization advocating for women's ordination was St. Joan's Alliance, founded in 1911 in London.

Catholic women religious were major participants in the first and second meetings of the Women's Ordination Conference. In 1979, Sister Theresa Kane, then the president of the Leadership Conference of Women Religious, spoke from the podium at Washington, DC's Shrine of the Immaculate Conception, and asked Pope John Paul II to include women "in all ministries of our Church". In the audience were fewer than fifty sisters wearing blue armbands, symbolizing women's ordination.

There are several others calling for the Catholic Church itself to ordain women, such as St. Joan's International Alliance, Circles, Brothers and Sisters in Christ, Catholic Women's Ordination, Corpus, and the Austrian-based Call to Disobedience.

=== Clergy ===
Servant of God Helder Camara supported women's ordination.

As of 2013, a minority in the Association of U.S. Catholic Priests support ordaining women to the priesthood and a majority favour allowing woman deacons. In 2014, the Association of Catholic Priests in Ireland stated that the Catholic Church must ordain women and allow priests to marry in order to survive.

In 2014, the Bishop of Basel, Felix Gmür, allowed the Basel Catholic church corporations, which are officially only responsible for church finances, to formulate an initiative appealing for equality between men and women in ordination to the priesthood.

In 2017, German bishop Gebhard Fürst supported the ordination of women to the diaconate. In October 2019 German bishop Franz-Josef Overbeck said many Catholic people don't understand why women are unable to be deacons or priests, which he thinks should be changed. German bishop Georg Bätzing supported women ordination. In August 2020, German archbishop Stefan Heße supported ordination of women in Catholic Church. In 2025, Swiss bishop Markus Büchel voiced his support for women's ordination. In 2026, Austrian archbishop Josef Grünwidl stated his support for women's ordination. Cardinal Jean-Claude Hollerich of Luxembourg publicly stated that ordination of women was essential to the future of the Church in 2026.

=== Theologians ===
In February 2011, 144 German-speaking academic theologians (making up one-third of the Catholic theology professors in Germany, Austria, and Switzerland) submitted a document styled as Church 2011 calling for a list of concessions including "women in (the) ordained ministry". The Pontifical Biblical Commission studied the matter in 1976, and found nothing in Sacred Scripture that specifically barred women from accession to the priesthood.

=== List of supporters ===
- Father Anne
- Helder Camara
- Jeannine Gramick
- Mary E. Hunt
- Mary B. Lynch
- Jamie Manson
- Donna Quinn
- Rosemary Radford Ruether

== Intersex and transsexuality ==
Having ambiguous, parallel or unusual genitalia, or rare chromosome combinations, is not an impediment to the priesthood, if it can be judged that general male characteristics dominate, so that the person is a male. There is no provision in Canon Law that specifically deals with intersex individuals. (It is an impediment to ordination to have a visible and distracting bodily difference that would make the priest the object of horror or derision, or prevent their duties, hardly the case with genitalia or genetics.) Ordination candidates are expected to be frank with their bishops, and are examined by a doctor.

The Catholic News Service reports that the church does not ordain anyone who has undergone sex reassignment surgery and gives a "recommendation of psychiatric treatment and spiritual counseling" for people who are transsexual, contending that these are an indicator of "mental instability".

== See also ==
- List of early Christian women presbyters
- Complementarianism
- Mulieris dignitatem, a 1988 apostolic letter by Pope John Paul II
- Women in the Catholic Church
- Priest shortage in the Catholic Church
- LGBT clergy in Christianity § Roman Catholicism
- Nancy Ledins – First openly transgender Roman Catholic priest
