= Catholic Apostolic Charismatic Church of Jesus the King =

Independent Catholic church based in Germany

The Catholic Apostolic Charismatic Church of "Jesus the King" (Spanish: Iglesia Católica Apostólica Carismática "Jesús Rey") is an independent Catholic international religious association, with headquarters and legal recognition in Munich, Germany. It is known for its bishop, Rómulo Antonio Braschi, a former Roman Catholic priest, who performed the ordinations of the Danube Seven.

== History ==
The community originated in Buenos Aires, Argentina, where its founder, Braschi, was born in 1941. He was ordained as a priest of the Roman Catholic Church in 1966. He embarked upon the early years of his priesthood against the backdrop of the political turbulence and social upheavals of Latin America in the 1960s and the repressive "National Security" governments of the 1970s. The radical stance of Braschi and his companions dates back to this time, when they were associated with the Movement of Priests for the Third World (MSTM), itself boasting radical left-wing and Peronist factions. Braschi was arrested for political reasons during the Dirty War.

In 2001, the Argentine government decided against granting the congregation official recognition, as potential confusion could cause injury to another confession; furthermore, according to the Argentine government, it did not have a sufficient presence in Argentina since it did not (then) have a stable community place of worship and no resident ministers there, being (in legal terms) effectively non-existent in Argentina.

== Controversy ==
From some conservative Catholic standpoints, the Church is controversial enough by its very existence, being a breakaway religious movement from the Roman Catholic Church. Furthermore, its founder and leader, ordained a Roman Catholic priest, has been consecrated bishop "validly but illicitly" in the episcopal lineage of Duarte Costa.

== Apostolic succession ==
Duarte Costa consecrated Salomão Barbosa Ferraz in 1945. Ferraz had been ordained an Anglican priest in 1917, and on 17 June 1928, he founded the non–denominational Order of San Andres. He called a "Free Catholic Congress" in 1936, establishing the "Free Catholic Church". The Order of San Andres and the Free Catholic Church (of Brazil) would eventually be merged, in the 1960s, into the Independent Catholic and Apostolic Church of Brazil. Ferraz converted to Roman Catholicism and his episcopal consecration was recognized as valid; he – and his wife – attended the sessions of the Second Vatican Council.

Garrido Padin consecrated Braschi in 1998.
