= Rómulo Antonio Braschi =

Argentine independent Catholic bishop

Rómulo Antonio Braschi (born December 25, 1941) is an Argentine independent Catholic bishop, not in communion with the Catholic Church. Braschi was labeled as being an episcopus vagans in the early 2000s.

== Biography ==
Born in Buenos Aires, and ordained a Roman Catholic priest in August 1966, he was associated with members of the worker-priest movement in Argentina and the Movement of Priests for the Third World. He was arrested and questioned for these activities during the Dirty War. Disillusioned by what he perceived as the silence and tacit condemnation of the Roman Catholic hierarchy in the face of progressive Church movements, he distanced himself from the Roman Church while resolving not to abandon his priestly ministry.

== Catholic Apostolic Charismatic Church of "Jesus the King" ==
In 1975 he set up an independent Catholic church in Buenos Aires Province. In 1978 this became the Catholic Apostolic Charismatic Church of "Jesus the King", (Note: In 2001, the Argentine government resolved that it causes confusion and granting it official recognition would cause injury to another confession; furthermore, according to the Argentine government, it is not a sociological entity since it has no religious community, it has no place of worship, it has no religious ministers, and is non-existent in Argentina.) now present in several European and Latin American countries, per its own claims. He was ordained as a bishop in Munich by Roberto Garrido Padin, a bishop of the Brazilian Catholic Apostolic Church, and Hilarios Karl-Heinz Ungerer, a bishop of the Free Catholic Church in Germany.

In 1999 he ordained his wife Alicia.

Braschi gained notoriety in 2002 when he took part in the ordinations of seven Roman Catholic women, who became known as the Danube Seven. The ordinations led to the women's excommunication by the Vatican. Braschi and the women asked the Vatican to revoke the excommunication, but they were denied in the Decree on the Attempted Ordination of Some Catholic Women. His excommunication was confirmed before this decree because he was already a leader of a schismatic denomination.

== See also ==
Roman Catholic Womenpriests
