= Presbytera =

Honorific title for a priest's wife or female church officer (archaic)

Presbytera (Greek: πρεσβυτέρα, pronunciation: /prezviˈtera/) is a term used in Christian traditions, primarily within Eastern Orthodoxy, to denote the wife of a priest. Historically, the term, derived from the Greek presbyteros ("elder" or "priest"), held multiple meanings in early Christianity, including a female church officer, a cloister matron, an abbess, or a priest’s wife. Over time, its usage evolved, particularly from the medieval period onward, to primarily signify the spousal role in both Greek and Latin Christian contexts. In contemporary Eastern Orthodox churches, the presbytera is recognized as a respected figure within the parish, often contributing to her husband’s ministry through social, spiritual, and sometimes professional roles, though she holds no ordained office.

== Etymology ==
The term presbytera (πρεσβυτέρα) or presbyterissa (πρεσβύτις) appears in early Christian writings with multiple meanings: it could denote:

- a priest's wife
- a female church officer
- a cloister matron
- an abbess

The term could refer to elderly women, the wives of male presbyters (priests), or, in some cases, women who held authority within local Christian communities. These women sometimes performed quasi-diaconal duties at the altar, assisted itinerant priests, and engaged in other presbyteral activities. Over time, however, its usage shifted, particularly in the medieval church, from a church role to a spousal title, much like diaconissa (a deacon's wife) and episcopa (a bishop's wife). Currently it is used in its feminine form to denote a priest's wife in many Christian traditions. The New Testament uses the term "presbyteros" which originates from the Greek word for "priest". It also occasionally refers to bishops, highlighting their honored status rather than their specific duties.

== History ==
=== Antiquity ===
During the first two centuries of Christianity, the office of presbyter was not defined by gender, nor was it limited solely to priestly functions like presiding over the Eucharist. In this period, both male and female presbyters undertook a wide array of responsibilities. From the 3rd century, presbyters took on pastoral and liturgical roles, leading local churches, resembling modern priests by the 5th–6th centuries. According to one scholar, early rites of ordination was functional, not sacramental (a 12th–13th-century concept), enabling women to serve as presbyters or deacons. Some presbyterae were active ministers, others honorary priests’ wives. Inscriptions from Italy, Poitiers, and Croatia (4th–6th centuries) and papal records up to the 12th century show women leading liturgies and serving at altars. Evidence from literary sources, such as Bishop of Vercelli, Atto of Vercelli’s 9th century acknowledgment that female presbyters preached and taught in the early church, stating:

“In the primitive Church … many are the crops and few the laborers, for the helping of men, even religious women were ordained caretakers in the holy Church. … Not only men but also women presided over the churches because of their great usefulness … female presbyters assumed the office of preaching, leading, and teaching, so female deacons had taken up the office of ministry and of baptizing, a custom that no longer is expedient.”

By the 4th century, female presbyters were increasingly marginalized as deviants within orthodox Christianity, particularly through association with heterodox movements like Montanism. Epiphanius of Salamis (c. 374-377) explicitly connected presbytides with heretical groups while challenging their liturgical authority. This polemical tradition was maintained by heresiologists including Tertullian and Augustine, who systematically portrayed such practices as characteristic of sectarian deviation. Yet, the Synod of Laodicea (4th century) banned presbytidas ordinations, implying prior orthodox acceptance. Archaeological evidence corroborates this: mainstream Christian epitaphs list women as presbytis/presbytera in Uşak (Phrygia), Thera (Aegean), and Salona (Dalmatia). Late in the 5th century Pope Gelasius I protested that women in southern Italy were "serving at the sacred altars" and performing liturgical ministries reserved to men. His intervention marks the beginning of a gradual but decisive restriction of female presbyteral practice in the West.

=== Medieval ===
The role of presbytera underwent a decisive transformation from church role participation to marginalization during the early medieval period. Between the 5th and 10th centuries, Western church authorities systematically restricted these once-recognized clerical partners through conciliar decrees and papal interventions. According to William Cardman (2009), scholars observe significant regional distinctions: while Eastern sources focus almost exclusively on deaconesses, Western records emphasize women presbyters. This divide corresponds with parallel ecclesiastical efforts - Greek churches seeking to restrict deaconesses' roles, while Latin churches moved to prohibit female presbyters altogether.

In 494 CE, Pope Gelasius I condemned women ministering at altars in Southern Italy and Sicily. Around 500 CE, Gallic bishops criticized priests for letting women handle chalices. By 567 CE, the Second Council of Tours excommunicated presbyters cohabiting with their presbytera (canon 19) and restricted bishops without an episcopa from female followers (canon 14). In 578 CE, the Synod of Auxerre banned presbyters from sharing beds with their presbytera post-ordination. By 743 CE, Pope Zachary’s Roman Synod listed presbytera as forbidden for marriage, a rule Pope Leo VII reiterated in 937–939. The 8th–9th century Pseudo-Isidorian decretals cursed marrying a presbytera, and 9th-century Capitulare de villis penalized intercourse with presbyterae. By the 10th century, presbytera had largely vanished from ecclesiastical contexts.

== Historical role debate ==
Scholars debate whether women held higher clerical offices in early Christianity, particularly the presbyterate and episcopate.

Valerie Karras (2007) asserts that there is no similar feminized forms exist for the titles of presbyter, as the masculine form presbyteros are retained even when referring to female subjects, which undermines claims that women held these higher offices. She asserts that because of this grammatical and terminological discrepancy, combined with the much stronger epigrammatic evidence for the female diaconate compared to the sparse and ambiguous evidence for female presbyters or bishops, provides a sound basis for recognizing the former as a clearly established clerical order.

However, other scholars present textual, epigraphic, and iconographic evidence contradicting Karras’s claims. For example:

- Gary Macy (2007) identifies five inscriptions referring to women as presbyterae, concluding they likely functioned as priests.
- Kevin Madigan and Carolyn Osiek (2011) cite the Poitiers graffito in which "Martia the presbytera made the offering together with Olybrius and Nepos," an inscription they present as evidence that a woman co-celebrated the Eucharist with male clergy.
- Mary Schaefer (2013) cites literary and artistic evidence, including the second-century Shepherd of Hermas (which calls Grapte hē presbyterá).
- Elm (1996) mentions Tekousa, a presbytera parthenos (virgin elder) who symbolically guided seven women in asceticism.
- Ilaria Ramelli and Joan E. Taylor argued that Theosebia was a presbyter (priest). They base this on Gregory of Nyssa’s funeral oration, which calls her syllēitourgos ("fellow minister"), a term normally applied to clergy, and on parallels with female presbyterae inscriptions from late antiquity.

== Roman Catholicism ==
Clerical marriage was an established practice, having risen to the level of a regular institution where a priest's marriage was no more suspect than that of a layman. Married priests remained respected, as he was just as respected and loved after his marriage as before. By the Gregorian Reform era, resistance emerged because priestly marriage had become ingrained in custom. The Roman Catholic Church states that titles like presbytera and episcopa described women in unofficial roles, not ordained priests or bishops. These were often honorary or family-related titles, such as a priest’s wife or widow, before mandatory celibacy (after 1139 CE). For instance, Theodora, called episcopa in a 9th-century mosaic, is considered Pope Paschal I’s mother, not a bishop.

== Lutheranism ==
In denominations of the Confessional Lutheran churches, which have a male presbyterate, the role of the wife of a priest is honored. In the Evangelical Lutheran tradition, part of the role of a pastor's wife is to support the vocation of her husband in holy orders. Various resources exist to support pastor's wives in the Lutheran Church – Missouri Synod.

== Eastern Orthodoxy ==
=== Responsibilities ===
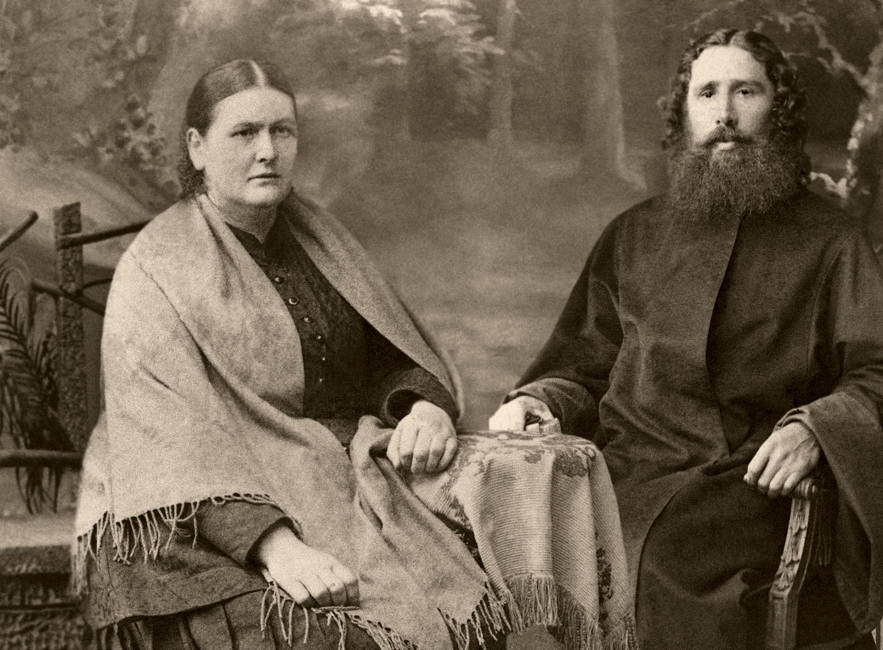
Priest Vasily Rozov and Matushka "little mother" Maria Khrisanfovna

The title presbytera and its equivalents are still widely used in Eastern Orthodox communities today, where the priest’s wife often holds a respected role within the parish, though not an ordained office. The role of the priest’s wife blends social and spiritual duties into a recognized form of ministry. Alongside traditional responsibilities, such as managing the household, nurturing family life, and organizing domestic devotion, she often contributes to the broader parish community. In many contemporary Byzantine Orthodox churches, women also actively participate in public worship, serving as choir directors, Scripture readers, and altar assistants. Regarding participation, Ecumenical Patriarch Bartholomew of Constantinople stated the following about the role: "in our ecclesiastical tradition, [the priest's wife] is addressed as presbytera, the other half of the presbyteros (priest)."

According to Athanasia Papadimitriou (2004) within parish community, responsibilities may include:

- Share in her husband's ministry.
- Volunteer member of various church committees and projects.
- Become professionally involved in the parish ministry.
- Support her husband by aligning her contributions with parish needs.
- Evaluate her own talents, skills, and interests, and proceed accordingly.

== Notable figures ==
=== Antiquity ===
- Ammion (c. 200–210 CE, Phrygia): Presbytera on 3rd-century tombstone; church leader under Bishop Diogas.
- Artemidora (c. 2nd–3rd century, Aegyptus): Presbytera on mummy label; church leader in Egypt, daughter of Mikkalos.
- Flavia Vitalia (fl. 425 CE, Salona): Presbytera sancta; led Salona church, sold burial tomb for three gold solids.
- Giulia Runa (c. 5th–6th century, Hippo Regius): Presbyterissa on mosaic in St. Augustine’s basilica; led North African church.
- Leta (d. 494 CE, Tropea): Presbytera in tomb inscription; held independent presbyteral office, not tied to husband’s role.
- Macrina (d. 380 CE, Pontus): Presbyterian per Basil of Caesarea; founded and led monastery, educated as a senior ascetic leader.

=== Modern ===
- Athanasia Papademetriou: Orthodox author and priest’s wife.
- Dr. Eugenia Constantinou: Orthodox professor and lecturer on the Bible (patristic interpretation), and early Christianity.
- Dr. Kyriaki Karidoyanes FitzGerald: Orthodox author and professor.

== Translations & cultural meaning ==
Across Orthodox Christian jurisdictions, priests' wives are addressed by distinct titles reflecting their role and cultural traditions:

| Language | Word | Pronunciation | Description |
|---|---|---|---|
| Albanian | Priftëreshë | (PRIF-teh-resh-uh) | Derived from "prift" (priest), denoting the wife of a priest. |
| Antiochian | Khouria | (KHOO-ree-ah) | From Arabic "khūrī" (priest, Greek origin), used in Antiochian Orthodox contexts. |
| Arabic | خورية (khūrīah) قسيسة (qasīsa) | (khoo-REE-ah) (kah-SEE-sah) | From "khūrī" (priest, Greek origin), meaning the wife of a priest. From "qasīs" (priest, Syriac origin), an alternate term for a priest’s wife. |
| Chinese | 师母 (Shīmǔ) | (SHEE-moo) | Literally "wife of a teacher," commonly used in Protestant churches. |
| Coptic | ⲧⲁⲥⲱⲛⲓ (Tasoni) | (tah-SOH-nee) | From Coptic, meaning "sister," used for the wife of a Coptic priest. |
| Greek | Presvytera | (pres-vi-TEH-rah) | From "presbyteros" (priest), meaning the "other half" of the priest; colloquially "papadia." |
| Italian | Presbitera | (pres-bee-TEH-rah) | Formal term from Greek "presbytera," used for a priest’s wife. |
| Portuguese | Presbítera | (pres-BEE-teh-rah) | Formal term from Greek "presbytera," used in ecclesiastical contexts. |
| Romanian | Preoteasă | (preh-oh-TEH-ah-sah) | From "preot" (priest), meaning the wife of a priest. |
| Russian | Matushka (MAH-toosh-kah) Popadya | (MAH-toosh-kah) (poh-PAH-dyah) | Meaning "little mother," symbolizing her nurturing role in the parish.(most common term); From pop (priest); archaic. |
| Ukrainian | Panimatka / Panimatushka Popadya | (pah-nee-MAH-toosh-kah) (poh-PAH-dyah) | From "pani" (lady) + "matushka" (diminutive of "mama"), meaning a nurturing figure. Literally "priest’s wife," from "pop" (priest). |

== See also ==
- Diakonissa
- Episcopa Theodora
- First lady
- List of early Christian women presbyters
