= List of early Christian women presbyters =

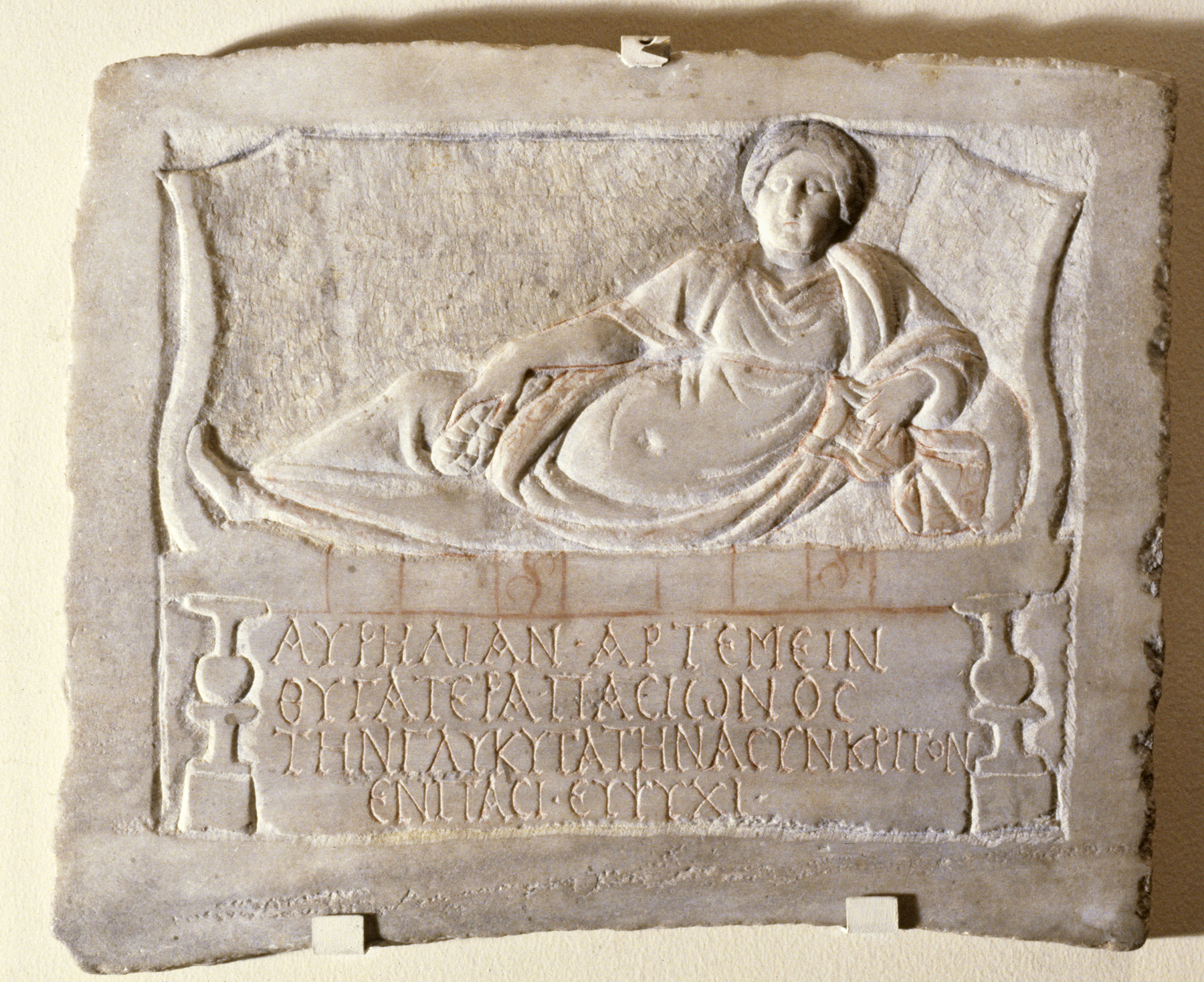
Funerary inscriptions is used as evidence of women presbyters in antiquity

This list of early Christian women presbyters includes female figures from the 2nd to 7th centuries CE who were referred to by titles such as presbytera or presbytis, which can indicate either a priest's wife, female church officer, cloister matron, or abbess.

2nd-century and later funerary inscriptions from Phrygia, Thera, and Salona, along with church orders such as the Testamentum Domini, preserve feminine forms of the term presbyter (e.g., presbytera, presbytis). Thus, scholars differ on whether these titles indicate an ecclesiastical office or other forms of status.

By the 4th century, institutional opposition to female roles arose, such as a local ban held at the Synod of Laodicea (c. 363–364) and Pope Gelasius I's condemnation (494) of women ministering at altars. Despite this, some later inscriptions and regional councils (e.g. Nîmes, 394) suggest women continued to hold ministerial roles in certain monastic and pastoral roles.

Scholars debate whether titles like presbytera or sacerdota ("priestess") indicated true sacramental authority or were honorific and functional leadership titles, since the concept of ordained priesthood evolved over time.

Entries in this list include attested individuals, groups, and notable references to women presbyters, organized by region, period, and type of evidence (inscriptions, conciliar records, patristic writings). Historical and scholarly interpretations are provided for each entry.

== History ==
Some scholars contend that during the first two centuries, the office of presbyter was not defined by gender; nor was it limited solely to priestly functions like presiding over the Eucharist. In this period, scholars argued that both male and female presbyters undertook an array of responsibilities. According to Gary Macy, early ordination was "functional", which enabled women to serve as presbyters or deacons, and modern sacramental standards misjudge early female ordinations.

Muir states that some presbyterae were active ministers, while others were honorary priests' wives. Inscriptions from Italy, Poitiers, and Croatia (4th–6th centuries) and papal records up to the 12th century reportedly describe women leading liturgies and serving at altars.

From the 4th century, female presbyters were debated as the orthodox church opposed groups like Montanists. Epiphanius of Salamis (ca. 374–377) linked presbytides to heretics and denied their sacramental roles (Panarion 79.3–4). The Council of Laodicea banned presbytidas ordinations, implying a prior practice that required suppression. Mainstream Christian epitaphs name women as presbytis or presbytera in Uşak (Phrygia), Thera (Aegean), and Salona (Dalmatia).

Late in the 5th century, Pope Gelasius I protested that women in southern Italy were "serving at the sacred altars" and performing liturgical ministries reserved to men (Letter 14.26). His intervention marks the beginning of a gradual but decisive restriction of female presbyteral practice in the West.

In the 10th century, Bishop Atto of Vercelli writing to priest named Ambrosius, wrote that in the early church it was the case that "not only men but also women presided over churches," which he explains as a matter of pastoral usefulness, since women long accustomed to pagan rites and trained in philosophical teaching were more readily converted and instructed through women. Citing the Council of Laodicea's later prohibition, he notes that "those who are called presbyterae or presiding women" were not to be ordained, and he adds that "those who were called presbyterae" took up the work of "preaching, directing, or teaching," which he treats as a practice that "now is by no means expedient" in his own day.

== 2nd to 3rd century ==
=== Ammion ===
Ammion the Presbytera flourished around fl. 200–210 CE in Phrygia. A third-century tombstone from Uçak, Phrygia reads: "Bishop Diogas, in memory of Ammion the presbytera." Eisen places the stone in a small series of doorstone inscriptions from Uçak dated to the first half of the third century.

Eisen notes that the series begins with a tombstone for Bishop Artemidoros, erected by Diogas "with church funds," and dated by Marc Waelkens to the first decades of the third century. She treats Ammion’s inscription as part of the same series and suggests Diogas commissioned it as bishop. The series ends with Diogas's own tombstone, set up by his wife Aurelia Tatiane. Gibson and Waelkens identify the Diogas in all three inscriptions as the same person, allowing his episcopate to be dated to the second quarter of the third century.

Eisen notes that πρεσβύτερα can mean an "older woman" (or the elder of two women with the same name) or function as an office-title, and she reports that Gibson and Waelkens take it as a title in Ammion’s case. She adds that this ambiguity is common in epigraphic and literary evidence.

Gibson labeled Ammion a Montanist mainly because Epiphanius says some Montanist-related groups ordained women presbyters (Pan. 49), but she notes Ammion’s inscription lacks other Montanist markers (e.g., πνευματικός). August Strobel and Marc Waelkens expressed doubts about classifying the series as Montanist, and concludes that Ammion cannot be assigned with certainty to Montanist circles or to the Great Church.

Tabbernee calls Ammion’s tombstone the earliest unequivocal epigraphic reference to a Christian woman titled presbytera as a female presbyter.

=== Artemidora ===
Artemidora flourished around 2nd–3rd century in Aegyptus. She is named on a Christian mummy label from Egypt, which reads in abbreviated Greek: "(Mummy) of Artemidora, daughter of Mikkalos, (and) mother Paniskiaina, presbyter, slept in the Lord."

According to Fogagnolo, the label belongs to the corpus published by François Baratte and Bernard Boyaval (1211 mummy labels) and follows a common, compressed funerary pattern, giving the deceased's name, parentage, a title, and a Christian burial formula (including a nomen sacrum).

The central question is who the title "πρεσβ(…)" (presb-) describes, and what it means. Madigan and Osiek note that the abbreviation is sometimes interpreted as "elder" in the sense of advanced age, but it is more often taken as a title of office, as they also observe that, because all names appear in the genitive case, an alternative (though less likely) reconstruction would make Artemidora the wife of Mikkalos and the mother of Paniskiaina, allowing the title to refer to Paniskiaina instead.

Horsley argues that the abbreviated form (printed as pres’β’’) is best understood as a title, and he considers it more likely that Artemidora herself was a presbyter in the Egyptian church.

=== Paniskianes ===
Paniskianes flourished around fl. 2nd–3rd century in Aegyptus. She is mentioned in a second- or third-century mummy inscription from Egypt connected with Artemidora. [Artemidora], daughter of Mikkalos, fell asleep in the Lord; (and) her mother Paniskianes (was) an elder (Greek feminine form: presbytera).

In the most common reconstruction, the inscription commemorates "Artemidora, daughter of Mikkalos, and (her) mother Paniskianes," and includes the abbreviated title presb (sometimes printed as pres'b) with the formula "slept in the Lord." Madigan and Osiek note that presb is sometimes taken to mean "elder" in the sense of advanced age, but is more often understood as a title of office. They further observe that the word order matches the typical pattern of such inscriptions (name, father, mother, age, origin, title, date), although the age, origin, and date are not preserved in this example.

Because the surviving names appear in the genitive case, Madigan and Osiek also report a secondary, less likely reading: that Artemidora is the wife of Mikkalos and the mother of Paniskianes. Paniskianes could be the family member who bore the title presb. The authors suggest it should be considered alongside Synod of Laodicea, which sought to abolish certain roles associated with women called presbytides.

=== Epikto ===
Epikto or Epiktas, flourished around fl. 2nd–3rd century in Thera. Epikto the Presbyter, titled presbytis, is commemorated in a brief second- or third-century inscription from Thera, one of the Cyclades islands in the Aegean Sea, reading "Angel of Epikto presbyter."

This inscription is among approximately forty-seven from Thera introduced by the term "angelos," followed by a name in the genitive case, most widely accepted as Christian despite debates over their pagan, Jewish, or Christian origins.

Rangar Cline notes that scholars who favor a Christian interpretation of the Theran angelos stelai have often cited Epikto's epitaph, reading πρεσβύτις (presbytis) as an ecclesiastical title. Scholars in favor include H. Grégoire, Jeanne and Louis Robert, and Dennis Feissel in this direction. Grégoire connected πρεσβύτις to the canons of Laodicea (ca. 360), taking it to mean "deaconess," and combined this with a symbol he understood as a cross-monogram to argue that the wider Theran corpus should be classified as Christian.

Cline notes that πρεσβύτις, like angelos, has both mundane and ecclesiastical senses, and that while πρεσβύτις can be read as "eldress" or "deaconess," it can also mean simply "elder woman." He notes that the title appears on a Jewish epitaph from Rome in a non-ecclesiastical sense, and he reports Guarducci's suggestion that πρεσβύτις in Epikto's case could have served to distinguish an older Epikto from a younger Epikto in the same community. Although Epikto's epitaph can be suggestive of Christianity, but it does not by itself prove that the Theran angelos tombstones are Christian.

The concept of a guardian angel for a tomb, prominent in this collection and seen elsewhere (e.g., Agaliasis from Melos), is sometimes taken to fit a Christian interpretation. Later canon law, including Canon 11 of the Synod of Laodicea, mentions presbytides, but the precise meaning and function of the title are disputed in modern discussion. Hans Achelis notes that if presbytis is the only office mentioned, Epikto would likely have led the Christian community on Thera.

=== Apollonia of Alexandria ===
Apollonia of Alexandria flourished around c. 249, and is accounted by Dionysius of Alexandria (d. 264 CE) in Eusebius's Ecclesiastical History. Dionysius describes her as "the most admirable virgin presbytis Apollonia", (Note: Greek: "τὴν θαυμασιωτάτην τότε παρθένον πρεσβῦτιν Ἀπολλωνίαν") using the term parthenos presbyteris, elderly virgin. She was reportedly held in high esteem within the Christian community of Alexandria.

According to Dionysius, a mob seized Apollonia and broke all her teeth through repeated blows. The persecutors then erected a pyre outside the city gates, threatening to burn her alive unless she renounced her faith by uttering blasphemous statements.

The title presbyteris applied to Apollonia has generated scholarly debate. The Catholic Encyclopedia interprets her as a deaconess rather than simply an elderly virgin. Kroeger argues the title parallels the masculine prokathemenos, a male presbyter who presided at the Eucharistic liturgy, suggesting Apollonia may have held liturgical office. However, Epiphanius of Salamis and Theodoret explicitly rejected attributing sacerdotal functions to women identified as presbyterides.

== 4th century ==
=== Unnamed Catanian ===
Unnamed Catania presbytera flourished around fl. 300–350 CE in Catania. Greek epitaph: "Here lies the ever-virgin Theodoule, who lived 22 years. She died three days before the Kalends of January. The burial was granted as a gift, by authority of the seal of the presbytera (Πρεσβυτέρα)." The slab ends with a staurogram (the cross-like monogram) integrated into the teleuta ("ending") line, marking it as a Christian burial.

Irma Bitto (1996) argues for the feminine, noting: The full spelling πρεσβυτέρας appears in comparable Sicilian Christian text. Theodoule's burial near martyrs suggests special status possibly overseen by women ministers.

Bitto's places Theodule's death around the same persecution that claimed Saint Euplius of Catania (+304 CE).

=== Unnamed Laodicea women ===
Eisen associates the mid-fourth-century Synod of Laodicea (c. 360 CE) with a conciliar prohibition on "appointing (stabilire/ordinare) presbytides in the churches". The complete Canon 11 states: "Concerning that it is not necessary (that one ought not) to appoint in the church those women who are called presbytides, that is, those who sit in front (female presidents)." (Note: Greek: "Περὶ τοῦ μὴ δεῖν τὰς λεγομένας πρεσβύτιδας, ἤτοι προκαθημένας, ἐν τῇ ἐκκλησίᾳ καθίστασθαι.")

Theodore Balsamon says that, in earlier times, certain "venerable women" (πρεσβύτιδες) were present in churches to supervise women and maintain "good and modest order," but he adds that abuses led to scandal, and he states that the Church Fathers prohibited having any further women called presbytides or presidents in the Church thereafter.

Karl Joseph von Hefele says "it is doubtful what was here intended," and notes that the canon has received "very different interpretations." He also reports that John Zonaras and Balsamon took the terms to mean "aged women in general (ex populo)" assigned "the supervision of the females, in church," a practice the synod "did away with" because the role had been misused for "pride, or money-making, bribery, etc."

Ferrandus of Carthage, writing in the 6th century, interpreted Canon 11's presbytides as referring to widows, senior women, univirae (women married only once), and matriculae (enrolled women). In one manuscript variation, he added the phrase "as if they have been ordained."

=== Choir of virgins at Nyssa ===
Choir of virgins at Nyssa flourished around fl. late 370s–early 380s CE in Nyssa. In Letter 6.10, Gregory of Nyssa writes about a woman who holds the title πρεσβυτέρα (presbytera), translated as "elder" or "presbyteress," leading a "choir of virgins" (a monastic or ascetic community of celibate women).

Gregory describes her as having authority over the group, likely involving spiritual guidance, discipline, and liturgical participation. "The presbytera of the choir of virgins... whom we have entrusted with the care of the virgins' community."

=== Theosebia ===
Theosebia flourished around b. 4th century CE; d. 381 CE in Cappadocia. Gregory of Nyssa calls her "our συμπρεσβυτέρῳ" ("fellow-presbyter"). Modern reassessment sees this as more than honorific, pointing to a recognised female presbyter within the Cappadocian circle.

=== Macrina the Younger ===
Macrina the Younger (c. 327–380 CE) was a monastic leader in Pontus who founded several monasteries and received an education equivalent to that of her brother Basil the Great.

She established the monastic community at Annisa, where she served as presbytera, a role later assumed by her successor Lampadion.

The Annisa community operated under a coordinate hierarchical structure that reflected Basil's principles of ecclesiastical order and propriety.

In Basil's monastic vision, men, women, and children resided in separate quarters within a unified community dedicated to Christian ethical practice. Leadership was divided between male superiors (presbyter/proestos) and female superiors (presbytera/proestosa).

The male superior retained oversight of the women's quarters but exercised this authority through his female counterpart, requiring mutual consultation for major decisions and refraining from entering the women's quarters without her presence.

=== Lampadion ===
Lampadion flourished around fl. late 4th–early 5th centuries CE in Pontus. Successor to Macrina the Younger as superior (πρεσβυτέρα, presbytera) of the women's monastic community at Annisa, a double monastery founded by Macrina. Described as a deaconess (διάκονος) in Gregory of Nyssa's Life of Macrina, she managed daily operations under Macrina's oversight. The Syriac translation of Basil the Great's Shorter Rules (QF 162) renders her title as "deaconess," while the original Greek uses presbytera.

The treatment of the female superior differs by language: the Greek preserves the original term presbytera (feminine of "elder"), the Latin opts for "senior mother," and the Syriac renders it as "deaconess" (the title used for Lampadion in the Life of Macrina). Basil requires that a deaconess be present during a sister's confession to the presbyter. In Annisa, as noted by Translator Anna M. Silvas, the monks' leader is termed πρεσβύτερος or προεστώς, whereas the nuns are guided by a πρεσβυτέρα or προεστῶσα who functions as a co-ordinate superior, emphasizing the distinct yet collaborative roles assigned to male and female monastic leadership.

=== Unnamed Syrian women ===
Unnamed Syrian women flourished around fl. late 4th century CE in Syria. In the Didascalia Apostolorum, a 3rd-century Syrian church order, as women who exercised episcopal-like functions, such as oversight, competing with male bishops.

According to Hans Achelis, these presbytides performed duties like prayer, intercession, theological instruction, anointing the baptized, and caring for the sick, which overlapped with episcopal roles, prompting efforts to limit their authority.

== 5th century ==
=== Testamentum Domini women ===
Testamentum Domini (TD) women flourished around fl. early 5th century CE in Syria or Egypt. These women presbyters were to be remembered in the liturgy and were required to remain with the bishop during night-vigils. They were ranked between deacons and sub-deacons in the ecclesiastical hierarchy.

The text states: "For the presbyteresses let us beseech that the Lord may hear their supplications and keep their hearts perfectly in the grace of the Spirit and help their work" (TD 1.35). Additionally, we read of a vigil: "Let the presbyteresses stay with the bishop until dawn, praying and resting" (TD 2.19).

=== Kalē ===
Kalē flourished around c. 374–424 CE (50 yrs.) in Centuripe. Inscription: "Kalē, (Presbytera), who lived fifty years blamelessly." No mention of a cleric-husband, indicating an independent ecclesiastical office.

=== Flavia Vitalia ===
Flavia Vitalia flourished around fl. 425 CE in Salona. Given the title "presbytera sancta" and "matrona" (free-born, married woman), Flavia Vitalia was a recognized leader in the Christian community of Salona, an early Christian center. She sold a burial tomb to Theodosius II for three gold solids, a duty usually exercised by male presbyters in Rome.

Madigan and Osiek states that her title suggests official leadership, although "presbytera" can sometimes refer to a presbyter's wife.

Patte aruges that it is unlikely in this case because "holy" is a title commonly associated with clergy, and it is she, rather than her husband, who acts as the church's representative in the sale of property. If this is the case, it remains unclear what additional presbyteral functions, such as sacramental duties, she may have performed.

=== Guilia Runa ===
Guilia Runa flourished around fl. after 431 CE in Hippo Regius. Guilia Runa, identified as a presbyteress (presbiterissa) in an inscription from a medallion mosaic in the church of St. Augustine in Hippo, North Africa.

According to Madigan and Osiek, she held a recognized leadership role within her community during the Vandal occupation after 431 CE.

Likely a Vandal by name and baptized as an Arian Christian, she lived for fifty years and died during or after this period. Her role as presbyteress suggests she was among the leading female ministers, possibly functioning similarly to a widow or deacon, though she likely did not perform routine presbyteral duties.

Following Justinian's reconquest of North Africa in 534 CE, which ended the Vandal kingdom and led to the decline of Arian Christianity, it remains uncertain whether Guilia Runa remained an Arian or converted to Catholic Christianity. Many Vandals were enslaved or fled, and the Catholic Church regained its prominence under Justinian's rule.

=== Aurelia Gaiana ===
An Etrurian inscription (CIL XV 7343) names Aurelia Gaiana (with Aurelius Hilarus) with the abbreviated title "pre(s)b(itores)", that is, presbitores (presbyters).

Yon states that the most common interpretation is to understand such "priestesses" as priests' wives, who do not themselves have cultic functions, though their marital status could give them social importance in the Christian community. He adds that the evidence does not allow a clear distinction between a cultic role and a priest's wife.

=== Unnamed Dalmatia women ===
Unnamed Dalmatia women flourished around fl. 5th century CE in Dalmatia.

Eisen states that a collection of 4th–6th century Dalmatian inscriptions refer to women as presbyters.

=== Unnamed Calabria woman ===
Unnamed dedicated epigraph to a Calabria woman who flourished around fl. 4th–5th centuries CE in Calabria.

=== Unnamed Poitiers woman ===
Unnamed dedicated epigraph to a Poitiers woman flourished around fl. 4th–5th centuries CE in Poitiers. Possibly practicing Priscillianism.

=== Martia ===
Martia flourished around fl. 5th century CE in Poitiers. The graffito found near Poitiers in Gaul presents a case of a woman named Martia referred to as "presbyteria" who made an offering together with Olybrius and Nepos. While the exact date is uncertain (possibly late 4th to 6th century), the most plausible interpretation suggests Martia held an official role as a presbyteress.

This reading aligns with contemporary Gallic church councils that used similar terminology, though we must distinguish Martia's apparent liturgical function from the non-clerical wives of priests mentioned in those same councils. The key question revolves around whether "presbyteria" describes the offering (as "priestly offerings") or Martia's role (as "presbyteress"). The latter interpretation makes more sense in context, especially considering Olybrius and Nepos were likely fellow presbyters. Unlike the priestly wives referenced in later Gallic legislation, Martia appears to have actively participated in the liturgy, suggesting she held a recognized ministerial position rather than simply being a priest's spouse.

=== Leta ===
Leta flourished around c. 453–494 CE (40 yrs.) in Tropea /Bruttium. Tomb inscription: "Leta the Presbytera, age 40 years, 8 months, 9 days. Husband un-titled; scholars see this as evidence of her independent presbyteral office in the orthodox church.

Traditionally, Leta was considered the wife of a presbyter, possibly linked to Monsis, a presbyter from Tropea (contemporary inscription).

However, Ute E. Eisen and Giorgio Otranto argue the inscription, from 5th-century Italy, suggests Leta held the independent role of presbytera. Otranto's analysis, citing Pope Gelasius I's letter (494 CE) criticizing women at altars. He indicates Leta's title is an ecclesiastical office, not merely a wife's status. Otranto says Inscriptions typically use coniux or amantissima for wives, and Leta's husband lacks a clerical title, strengthening the case for her as a "true presbyter." While not definitive, the evidence leans toward Leta's active presbyteral role. Greek-language epitaph calls her «Λήτα πρεσβύτερα».

=== Unnamed Italian women ===
Letter 14 of Pope Gelasius, written on 11 March 494, addressed to the bishops of Lucania, Bruttium, and Sicily under his direct metropolitan jurisdiction. The letter is a decretal regulating clergy rights and obligations.

In the letter, Pope Gelasius I protested that "women are serving at the sacred altars," declaring it wrong for women to minister at altars or assume offices assigned to men, adding he had heard "with impatience" that women were performing services belonging only to men and not to their sex.

Eisen treats this as a direct literary witness that women still exercised sacerdotal or presbyteral functions in Italian dioceses.

The Presbyters Project calls the letter a "rare example of a source" associating women with liturgical functions that may have been performed.

== 5th to 6th centuries ==
=== Giulia Runa ===
Giulia Runa flourished around fl. 5th–6th centuries CE in Hippo Regius. Identified as a presbyterissa on a grave mosaic in St. Augustine's basilica in Hippo, indicating a role as a female presbyter. Her existence suggests women held ecclesiastical leadership roles in North Africa, despite prohibitions like those in the Laodicean Council against ordaining women as presbyterae (recast as widows or "seniores").

=== Sacerdota woman ===
Sacerdota woman flourished around fl. 5th–6th centuries CE in Salona. A 5th–6th-century fragmentary inscription from Solin, reading "[SAC]ERDOTAE+" (genitive/dative of sacerdota, "priestess"), accompanied by a Christian cross, suggests a woman held a ecclesiastical role in Salona's Christian community. Found near Flavia Vitalia's presbytera sancta inscription (425 CE), it indicates women may have served as presbyters or, as Eisen proposes, possibly a bishop, given the distinct use of sacerdota over presbytera. The title likely denotes an official leadership position, not a priest's wife or an elderly woman, though the fragmentary evidence leaves the exact role uncertain.

=== Unnamed Gaul woman ===
Unnamed Gaul woman flourished around fl. 567 CE in Tours, Gaul. Within Council of Tours, Canon 14, it uses the phrase presbiter cum sua presbiteria ("a presbyter with his presbyteria").

According to Eisen, this shows that the feminine title was still current, though here reduced to the cleric's wife, and illustrates the terminological survival after the office's eclipse.

=== Syrica and unnamed Caralis women ===
According to Gregory the Great's Letter 9.213, written around 599 CE, he recounts a woman by the name of Syrica or Sirica, (Note: Sirica is attested as well. Syricam is the same name in the accusative case.) who was an abbess of the monastery of Saints Gavinus and Lussorius in Sardinia during the late 6th century. She refused to wear monastic clothing and instead wore the dress of a presbytera, which allowed her to retain control of her personal property.

Church law required that nuns and abbesses surrender their patrimony upon entering monastic life, but by dressing as a presbytera rather than adopting the monastic habit, Syrica circumvented this restriction and was able to leave her property to heirs outside the monastery. Her successor as abbess complained about this violation to Pope Gregory the Great around 599 CE.

Posternak argues that the letter shows "presbyterae" were a category of women in the Caralis communities, and probably in the western church more broadly, because Gregory does not treat the term as something rare or unique. He also takes the clothing contrast as evidence these presbyterae were not simply nuns, since monastic clothing and presbyterae clothing are presented as different. He comments that later canon law tradition made the passage harder to understand by reading presbyterae as "presbyteri."

== Non-historical ==
=== Grapte ===
A literary figure, dated around c. 100-150 CE based in Rome. Grapte appears in The Shepherd of Hermas, repeatedly called a "ἡ πρεσβυτέρα" ("the presbytera").

She sits on a white cathedra holding a book, and teaches widows and orphans. She orders Hermas to catechise the presbyters and represents the Church "created first of all things."

Grapte is interpreted by scholars such as Schaefer and Eisen as the presbytera, perhaps a hidden episcopa or quasi-bishop within the collegial early-Roman church before monarchical episcopacy solidified.

=== Praxedis and Pudentiana ===
The daughter of Pudens, led the titulus Pudentis house-church in 2nd-century Rome, hosting Christian gatherings. Traditionally considered a presbytera heading the titulus Praxedis, her role is supported by 17th–18th-century scholars Fioravante Martinelli and Benigno Davanzati.

The Santa Pudenziana apse mosaic (early 5th century) may depict her in ecclesiastical attire, suggesting presbyteral status. However, some scholars, like Fredric W. Schlatter (1995), argue the mosaic's female figures symbolize Ecclesia ex circumcisione (Church from the Jews) and Ecclesia ex gentibus (Church from the Gentiles), representing Jewish and Gentile wisdom.

Both Praxedis and Pudentiana died of natural causes, with Praxedis described as presbytidis (very old). If born around 66/67 CE, Praxedis would have been 82–84 years old at her death during Pope Pius I's pontificate. An ancient lectionary, possibly from Santa Prassede and preserved at the Vallombrosan monastery, records her death in 156 CE.

=== Mercuria ===
Mercuria is a literary figure; in the Vita of Euphemia, Mercuria is called a presbytera. She instructs other women, reads scripture and receives a letter from Christ.

=== Tekousa ===
She is a fictional female presbyter from a legend about two slaves, Xanthias and Polyxena. The legend itself may preserve traces of ascetic female leadership.

== Title variations ==
English	Greek	Description
Presbytera / Presbyteria	πρεσβυτέρα / πρεσβυτερία	Schaefer describes presbyterae as women treated as responsible leaders in some early Christian settings, including roles associated with communal oversight. Macy discusses presbytera in connection with a clerical ordo in which women could be distinguished by recognized status and dress. Madigan and Osiek note that the terms can denote either age or a formal Jewish or Christian office, and discuss instances where presbyterae have been interpreted as carrying sacerdotal functions in particular cases. Eisen and Kraemer note that in parts of the Western Church from the 6th to early 7th century CE, the both terms a could also be used for a presbyter's (unordained) wife, for example in the Council of Tours (567 CE), Canon 14.
Presbytis / Presbytides	πρεσβῦτις / πρεσβυτίδες	Presbytis (singular) and presbytides (plural) are feminine forms used for "women elders." Möller uses πρεσβυτίδες in discussing widows whose recognized standing was treated as closer to the presbyterate than to the diaconate, and argues that this presbyter-like widows' role was displaced as the office of deaconess became established, particularly in the Greek East. Madigan and Osiek treat presbytides as a title that could function as more than an age descriptor in some ecclesiastical settings. Kraemer states that inscriptional references to "women elders" using this terminology are often difficult to interpret.
Presbyterissa / Presbyterissae	πρεσβυτέρισσα	Presbyterissa is used variably. Depending on setting, it may denote a cleric's continent wife, or in some cases a woman described with recognized church status, possibly connected with leadership or liturgical roles. Schaefer notes the title's declining prominence in late antique ecclesiastical usage.
Priestess	ἱέρεια (Latin: sacerdota)	Alongside episcopa and "deaconess," Macy discusses sacerdota as a distinct ordo (Note: The Church adopted the term "order" (Latin: ordo, plural ordines) from Roman civic life. Tertullian first used it ecclesiastically to refer to both clergy and laity collectively. Over time, however, its meaning narrowed to designate a specific ecclesiastical office.) covering women associated with ordained ministry. Madigan and Osiek discuss sacerdota as denoting a "priestess," that is, a woman functioning as a priest within Christian communities.
Superior (Note: The term is also rendered as presbytera (πρεσβυτέρα) in some sources, including Basil’s Shorter Rules, where it is discussed alongside proestōsa for the same female leadership role in a monastic setting.)	προεστῶσα (proestōsa)	In Basilian monastic communities, the female superior could be titled proestōsa (προεστῶσα), the feminine form of proestōs, and is described as responsible for the spiritual and disciplinary oversight of the women's community.

== See also ==
- Head covering for Christian women – Women's head covering practices in Christian worship
- List of Christian women of the early church – Notable women in early Christianity
- Ordination of women in Christianity – Debates over women ordained to clergy
- Patristics – Study of early Church Fathers and writings
- Women in Church history – Women's roles across Christian history
