= Episcopa Theodora =

Ninth-century ecclesiastical figure in Rome

Theodora Episcopa
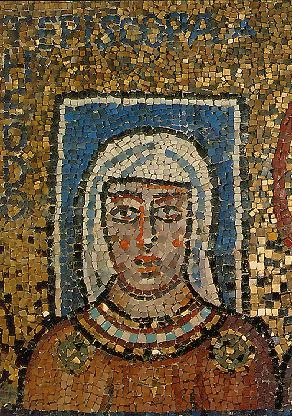
- Mother of Pope Paschal I, titled Episcopa
- Born: Unknown (Note: Theodora's birth date is not recorded in historical sources. Her activity is primarily documented during her son Pope Paschal I's papacy (817–824 AD).)
- Died: After 817 AD (Note: Theodora was alive in 817 AD, as indicated by her depiction with a square halo in the San Zeno chapel mosaic, signifying a living person. Her exact death date is unknown.)
- Occupation: Ecclesiastical figure (Note: The title "Episcopa" suggests a significant ecclesiastical role, possibly as a female bishop or an honorific title, though its exact nature is debated among scholars.)
- Years active: Early 9th century AD
- Known for: Titled "Episcopa" in mosaic and reliquary inscription at Santa Prassede, Rome
- Spouse: Bonosus
- Children: Pope Paschal I

Theodora, mother of Pope Paschal I and wife of Bonusus, lived in the early 9th century AD and is depicted in a mosaic in the Church of Santa Prassede, Rome (c. 900 AD), with the title "Episcopa." Scholars debate whether this indicates she was a female bishop or if it was an honorific title bestowed by her son. Pope Paschal I’s esteem for her is evident in the Chapel of Bishop Zeno, which he built in her honor within the church.

== Mosaic and inscription ==
=== Theodora Episcopa ===
During his papacy from 817 to 824 AD, Pope Paschal I relocated the relics of 2,300 martyrs from the catacombs to the San Zeno chapel in Santa Prassede, a space he constructed for his mother, Theodora Episcopa. A ninth-century (c. 900 AD) mosaic within the chapel features four women: the Virgin Mary, Saints Praxedis, and Prudentiana, each adorned with round golden halos symbolizing sainthood, and Theodora Episcopa, distinguished by a square white halo, indicating she was a living holy person at the time of its creation. She is wearing a white veil, and wears no jewellery.

Additionally, a reliquary inscription documents Pope Paschal I’s donation of further relics to the site, noting:

"... at the very entrance of the basilica, on the right-hand side, where indeed the body of his most gracious mother, namely the Lady Theodora Episcopa, rests, the aforementioned bishop [Pope Paschal I] placed the bodies of the venerable Zeno and others..."

== Bishop discussion ==
Theodora’s mosaic in the Church of Santa Prassede, inscribed with "episcopa," sparks diverse scholarly debate. In Roman Catholic tradition, women cannot be ordained priests or bishops, yet some proponents of women’s ordination cite Theodora’s title as evidence that women held episcopal roles in the 9th-century Church, implying she was not unique. Conversely, others argue "episcopa," the feminine form of "episcopus," referred to a bishop’s wife during a time when bishops could marry, a common early Church practice. Both views face scrutiny, as no other woman bishop or use of "episcopa" for a bishop’s wife is documented from this era. Gary Macy (2008) asserts that only five documented references exist to women serving as bishops in Western Christianity, notably, Terni epitaph, Umbria tombstone, and Brigid of Ireland.

Scholars like Karen Torjeson (1993), Elizabeth Ursic (2021), and Ute Eisen (2000) assert Theodora was a female bishop, supported by her significant church contributions, evidenced by the mosaic and a reliquary inscription. Ally Kateusz observes that while "EPISCOPA" remains intact, the letters "RA" were replaced with gold tesserae, possibly masculinizing her name to "THEODO" to obscure her role.

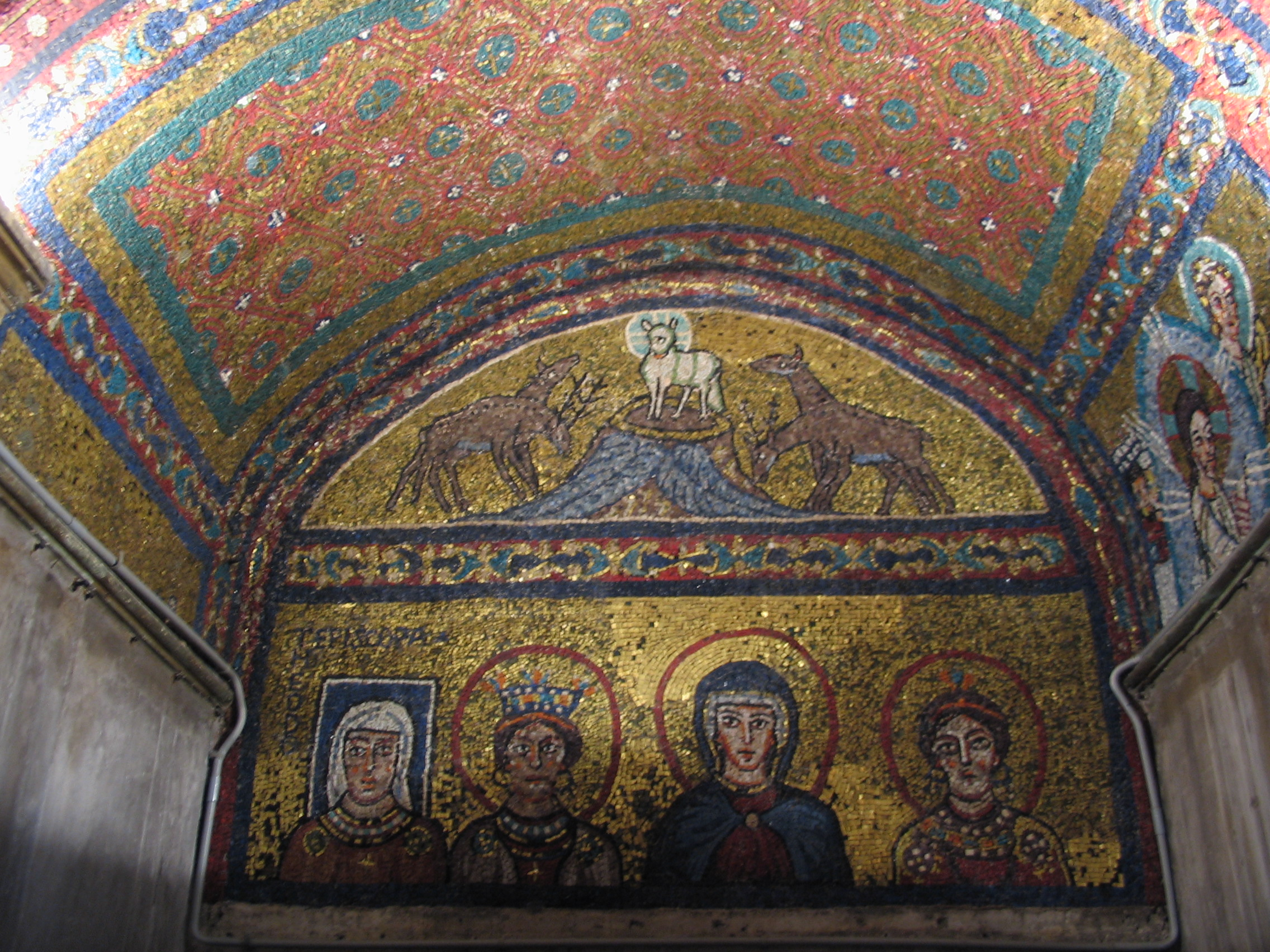
Mosaic in the Church of Santa Prassede, depicting (left to right): Theodora, Saint Praxedis, the Virgin Mary, and Saint Pudentiana, with the Agnus Dei, reindeer, and wolves above.

Alternatively, traditional scholarship, referencing Canon 14 of the Council of Tours, views "episcopa" as an honorific for bishops’ wives or, in Theodora’s case, as the mother of Pope Paschal I, potentially tied to her financial support for the church. The descriptor "benignissima" ("gracious" or "beneficent") supports this honorific interpretation. However, Ramelli et al. (2021) challenge this, noting that Pope Paschal’s father, Bonusus, was not titled "episcopus" despite his son’s position, indicating "episcopa" was not merely a relational title. Gary Macy (2008) and Eisen (2000) confirms Bonusus appears in the Liber Pontificalis without an official title.

Other theories suggest Theodora led a group of virgins and widows, as an inscription lists such women (e.g., Praxedis, Pudentiana), but their lack of explicit connection to her weakens this view. Charles Du Cange proposed she might have been an abbess, yet no evidence supports abbesses being titled "episcopa," and "abbess" would likely have been used instead. Some scholars propose "episcopa" is a Quattrocento interpolation, as the inscription shows restoration with a second tablet added post-line 37. Ursula Nilgen suggests it could be a "bowdlerization" of an illegible original, but Theodora’s consistent "episcopa" title in the St. Zeno chapel undermines this hypothesis.

== See also ==
- Diakonissa
- Presbytera
