= Episcopa =

Archaic title for a female church officer

Episcopa is a feminine Latin form derived from the masculine "episcopus" (bishop), rooted in the Greek episkopos ("overseer/bishop"). Its historical usage is debated among scholars, with three main interpretations: bishop's wife, ordained female bishop, or overseeing role (e.g. abbess). Archaeological and historical records provide evidence of women titled "episcopa", fueling discussions about their roles.

== Etymology ==
The term "episcopa" is contested. Some scholars propose it referred to bishops' wives, others suggest it denoted women overseeing groups like virgins or widows, similar to an abbess, and a minority argue it indicated women ordained as bishops with active ecclesiastical roles. However, these views face challenges: specialized roles like abbess had distinct terms (e.g., "abbatissa"), and Latin canonical texts, such as Canon 14 of the Council of Nicaea (325 AD), use "coniux" for a bishop's wife, not "episcopa", with no Latin literature applying "episcopa" to wives. Despite this distinction, 19th century literature still highlights it be referring to either the wife of a bishop, including one later ordained as such, or an abbess. Conversely, Ally Kateusz (2019) contends that "episcopa" designated female clergy serving as bishops in some Western communities, distinct from the masculine "episcopus".

== Notable cases ==
Several archaeological and historical records document women titled "episcopa", fueling debate over their roles. Gary Macy (2008) asserts that only five documented references exist to women serving as bishops in Western Christianity.

=== Terni epitaph (4th century) ===
A Latin epitaph from the late fourth century or later, found in the cemetery of the Basilica of St. Valentina in Terni, Italy, honors "(Hono)rabilis femina episcopa" (honorable woman bishop), also referred to as "Episcopa Terni" (Bishop Terni) in the Council of Tours, 567 AD (Canon 20). A Vatican Library manuscript also appears to list an episcopa taken from an epitaph from the same cemetery. The basilica, constructed over a Christian cemetery marking a third-century martyr-bishop's grave, provides no further details. Historian Joan Morris notes that while the church may have forgotten, "the very stones cry out" (p. 171).

=== Umbria tombstone (5th-6th century) ===
In Umbria, north of Rome, a 5th-6th century marble tombstone of a woman was discovered. Ramelli et al. (2021, p. 91) date it to 500 AD. The weathered inscription's first line is unclear, but the second line reads: "If you will, traveller, note this inscription: here lies the venerable lady, bishop Q-, laid to rest in peace for five years...". The term "venerable" (venembilis) typically denotes clergy, not laypeople or clergy spouses. The Latin "fem episcopa" explicitly means "woman bishop", and "sacerdota" in this period typically referred to a bishop, not a priest. Despite no mention of a husband or male bishop, most scholars assume she was a bishop's wife. Historian Giorgio Otranto named her Addirittura and has dated the inscription to 491 or 526 AD. Madigan and Osiek date it to 390 AD, while identifying "Q" as either the mother or wife of Pope Siricius (384–399 AD).

=== Theodora (9th century) ===
During his papacy (817–824 AD), Pope Paschal I relocated martyrs' relics from the catacombs, interring 2,300 bodies under the San Zeno chapel (Santa Prassede), built for his mother, Theodora Episcopa, as noted in an 817 AD relic register. A ninth-century mosaic in the chapel depicts four women: Mary, Sts. Praxedis, and Prudentiana with round golden halos indicating sainthood, and Theodora Episcopa with a square white halo, signifying a living holy person. A reliquary inscription records Paschal I donating relics to the resting place of his mother, Theodora, titled "Episcopa". The feminine title "Episcopa", inscribed above Theodora's mosaic portrait (c. 900 AD), may indicate her role as a female bishop, as argued by scholars like Karen Jo Torjeson (1993) and Elizabeth Ursic (2021). The square halo suggests she was alive at the time of the portrait. Eisen (2000) stated that Theodora must have made significant contributions to the Church of Santa Prassede. She was honored with the title "episcopa", as shown by a mosaic and a reliquary inscription. Thus, her role as a bishop in Rome should be recognized. According to Ramelli et al. (2021, p. 90), Paschal's father Bonosus was never a bishop nor recognized as an episcopus. Therefore, Theodora's title of "episcopa" could not have come merely from her familial connection and must derive from another source or role.

=== Brigid of Ireland (9th century) ===
Gary Macy (2008) cites the 9th-century Bethu Brigte, which describes Brigid of Ireland as ordained to the episcopacy. The text recounts Bishop Mél of Ardagh, "intoxicated with the grace of God", mistakenly consecrating Brigid with bishop's orders, marked by a fiery column ascending from her head. The account explicitly states Brigid was ordained as a bishop, not metaphorically, and Bishop Mel affirmed her unique episcopal status, indicating that, for this Irish writer, a woman could be ordained as a bishop. Multiple medieval sources assert that she was ordained as a bishop, a title that her successors as abbess at Kildare retained until Ireland's ecclesiastical hierarchy was significantly reformed in 1152 AD during the Synod of Kells.

== Bishop's wife ==
In the sixth century (especially in Gaul), the episcopa, a bishop's wife who vowed sexual continence after her husband's ordination, held a prominent yet complex role. These women, often from senatorial families, contributed to church decoration and benefactions, as seen with Namatius's wife, who donated Saint Stephen's church and oversaw its frescoes, and Placidina, who adorned Saint Martin's Basilica, co-donated a chalice, and decorated Saint Bibianus's tomb.

After a bishop's death, episcopal were expected to embody the ideal Christian widow, engaging in charity for the poor and prisoners while forbidden by canon law from remarrying. When exemplifying piety and chastity, aligning with the church's spiritual marriage ideal, where bishops, vowing continence since the fourth century, treated wives as sisters, episcopae were praised, as evidenced by Sidonius Apollinaris's admiration of Simplicius's wife's virtue and Venantius Fortunatus's celebration of Placidina's nobility and contributions.

Gregory of Tours honored chaste episcopae like Euphrasia for her charity, though he and others, like Bishop Felix of Nantes, also portrayed some negatively, depicting them as threats to clerical continence or sources of scandal, as seen in tales of Urbicus's lustful wife or (Bishop Badigysel) Magnatrude's interference, possibly shaped by personal biases. Gallic councils, including Clermont (535) and Orléans (538/541), enforced strict rules to prevent sexual relations and limit episcopae's access to bishops' residences, reflecting fears of scandal. By the seventh and eighth centuries, monastic reforms, such as those under Chrodegang of Metz, reduced the episcopa's role, with some bishops' wives entering nunneries instead of assuming the title.

== See also ==
- List of ordained Christian women
