= Phyllis Zagano =

American author and academic (born 1947)

- Born: August 25, 1947 (age 79); Queens, New York, U.S.
- Education: Marymount College; Boston University; Long Island University; State University of New York at Stony Brook; St. John's University
- Occupations: Researcher and adjunct professor
- Employer: Hofstra University
- Awards: Fulbright Fellow, Mary Immaculate College, Limerick, Ireland, 2009; Fulbright Senior Scholar, Waterford Institute of Technology, 2015

Phyllis Zagano (born August 25, 1947) is an American author and academic. She has written and spoken on the role of women in the Roman Catholic Church and is an advocate for the ordination of women as deacons. Her writings have been variously translated into Indonesian, Czech, French, Italian, Portuguese, and Spanish.

== Early life and education ==
Zagano was born in Jamaica, Queens in New York City in 1947. She graduated from Sacred Heart Academy in 1965. She has a BA from Marymount College in Tarrytown, New York (1969); master's degrees in communications from Boston University (1970), in literature from Long Island University (1972), and in theology from St. John's University (1991); and a PhD from the State University of New York at Stony Brook in 1979.

== Career ==
Zagano was program officer at the National Humanities Center from 1979 to 1980, and taught at Fordham University from 1980 to 1984. She was a researcher at the Roman Catholic Archdiocese of New York from 1984 to 1986 and a Coolidge Fellow at the Episcopal Divinity School in Cambridge, Massachusetts in 1987. She taught at Boston University from 1988 to 1999.

Since 2002, Zagano has taught at Hofstra University in Hempstead, New York, where she is senior research associate-in-residence and adjunct professor of religion. In 2005 she held a visiting professorship at the Yale Divinity School in New Haven, Connecticut. In 2009, she was a Fulbright Fellow at the University of Limerick's Mary Immaculate College in Limerick, Ireland, where she was a lecturer. In 2015 she was a Fulbright Senior Specialist at the Waterford Institute of Technology, in Waterford, Ireland.

Zagano's scholarship and work as a theologian has been recognized by both awards and critical engagement. She received "Layperson of the Year" award from Voice of the Faithful in 2012. She received the Isaac Hecker Award for Social Justice from the Paulist Center of Boston in 2014. Two years later, in 2016, Pope Francis appointed Zagano to the Papal Study Commission on the Women's Diaconate. Prior to disputing with her ideas, Crisis Magazine described Zagano as "one of the most high-ranking feminists in the Catholic Church" in 2019.

Zagano's career also includes over 30 years as public affairs office in the U.S. Navy Reserve. She retired from the Navy Reserve at the rank of Commander.

Beginning in 2008, she has regularly donated her papers to the Women and Leadership Archives of Loyola University Chicago.

== Publications ==
Zagano's publications include:

- Woman to Woman: An Anthology of Women's Spiritualities, 1993, editor. ISBN 9780814650257.
- On Prayer: A Letter to My Godson, 1994. ISBN 9780764807954.
- Ita Ford: Missionary Martyr, 1996. ISBN 9780809136636.
- The Exercise of the Primacy: Continuing the Dialogue, 1998, co-editor. ISBN 9780824517441.
- Things New and Old: Essays on the Theology of Elizabeth A. Johnson, 1999, co-editor.
- Twentieth-Century Apostles: Christian Spirituality in Action, 1999.
- Holy Saturday: An Argument for the Restoration of the Female Diaconate in the Catholic Church, 2000; Catholic Press Association Book Award; 2002 College Theology Society Book Award. ISBN 978-0-8245-2163-9
- Dorothy Day, 2003, editor.
- Called to Serve: A Spirituality for Deacons, 2004.
- The Dominican Tradition: Spirituality in History, 2006, co-editor.
- Women & Catholicism: Gender, Communion, and Authority, 2011; Catholic Press Association Book Award in category B15, "Gender issues".
- Women Deacons: Past, Present, Future, 2011, with Gary Macy and William T. Ditewig.
- Women in Ministry: Emerging Questions about the Diaconate, 2012.
- Mysticism and the Spiritual Quest: A Crosscultural Anthology, 2013.
- Ordination of Women to the Diaconate in the Eastern Churches: Essays by Cipriano Vagaggini, 2013, editor and translator.
- Sacred Silence: Daily Meditations for Lent, 2014, 2024.
- In the Image of Christ: Essays on Being Catholic and Female, 2015.
- Women Deacons? Essays with Answers, 2016, editor and translator. Catholic Press Association Book Award in category B15, "Gender issues".
- The Light of the World: Daily Meditations for Advent, 2016.
- Women: Icons of Christ, 2020, Catholic Media Association Book Award for 2021 in Gender Issues-Inclusion in the Church category
- Elizabeth Visits the Abbey, 2022
- Just Church: Catholic Social Teaching, Synodality, and Women, 2023.
