= Diakonissa =

Greek title for a deacon's wife

Diakonissa is a Greek title of honor that is used to refer to a deacon's wife. It is derived from diakonos—the Greek word for deacon (literally, "server"). There does not currently seem to be any standard English equivalent, so most English-speaking Orthodox Christians will use the title most common in the old country churches from which their local family or parish finds its origin.

Diakonissa was also the term used in the ancient Church for the order of deaconess, a class of ordained women who saw to the care of women in the community.

== Other languages ==
In Arabic, a deacon's wife is called Shamassy (derived from Shamas, Arabic for "deacon"). Romanian uses a derivative from the Greek term, Diaconiţa, as does Serbian, Đakonica/Ђаконица (pronounced jack-on-eet'-sa). Other Slavic traditions generally use the same word for a deacon's wife that is used for a priest's wife: Matushka (Russian), Panimatushka (Ukrainian), etc.

== See also ==
- Episcopa Theodora
- Presbytera
