= List of Christian women of the early church =

This list of Christian women of the early church highlights female individuals who played important roles in shaping early Christianity as martyrs, leaders, teachers, prophets, and contributors to its growth. Spanning from the late first century to the sixth century, this period saw women actively involved in theological debates, social leadership within house churches, and spiritual practices such as preaching, prophesying, and martyrdom.

Each entry provides the woman's name, titles, roles, and region of activity. Titles such as deacon, martyr, empress, or Desert Mother indicate their societal and ecclesiastical significance. Many of these women were later canonized as saints or are venerated for their contributions. The "Description and Legacy" section outlines each individual's impact, drawing on historical, literary, and archaeological evidence, with a focus on minimizing reliance on hagiographic accounts. Reliable secondary sources or related articles support the information presented.

== List ==
Portrait	Name and Role	Period of Activity	Region of Origin	Description and Legacy
	Thecla (Disciple of Paul the Apostle)	fl. 30	Iconium	Thecla, featured in The Acts of Paul and Thecla, is celebrated for her celibacy, preaching, and advocacy for equality. Although often considered more legendary than historical due to its hagiographic nature and lack of corroborating evidence, the narrative influenced early Christian practices. In some ascetic communities, Thecla's story legitimized women as teachers and preachers, a role seen as compatible with divine and apostolic teachings.
	Tabitha, or Dorcas (Disciple of Jesus)	fl. 40–50	Jaffa	A woman from Jaffa, is described in Acts 9:36 as a disciple of Jesus, known for her charitable works, particularly making clothes for widows. Her death prompted a visit from the Apostle Peter, who, after praying, is said to have restored her to life. Tabitha's story is often cited as an example of service, charity, and the role of women in early Christianity.
	Priscilla (Missionary & Teacher)	fl. 49–65	Rome	Jewish Christian and tentmaker, partnered with Paul during his missionary journeys, living and working in Rome, Corinth, and Ephesus. Known for instructing Apollos and hosting house churches, she exemplified leadership and dedication to early Christianity. She is referenced in the New Testament (Acts 18:2–3, 18:18, 18:26; Romans 16:3–4; 1 Corinthians 16:19; 2 Timothy 4:19) for her hospitality, teaching, and commitment to the faith.
	Junia (Apostle)	fl. 50–56	Rome	Mentioned in Paul's epistle, Romans 16:7, she is associated with early Christianity in Rome or its vicinity. The text refers to her alongside Andronicus as noteworthy "among the apostles". Early interpretations, including patristic sources, predominantly affirm her identity as a female figure recognized in apostolic circles. Additionally, Junia was a female, and an apostle according to scholarly consensus among different academic fields.
	Phoebe (Deaconess & Saint)	fl. 56–58	Cenchreae	Phoebe, a 1st-century Christian deaconess from Cenchreae, is commended by Paul in Romans 16:1–2 for her service, generosity, and leadership. Likely entrusted with delivering Paul's letter to the Romans, she was a benefactor and supporter of early Christian communities, exemplifying faith and commitment in her role as a deacon and patron of the Church.
	Two Women (Deaconess)	fl. 112	Bithynia and Pontus	Pliny, investigating Christianity, tortured two enslaved deaconesses, finding only what he termed "depraved, excessive superstition". His dismissive language reflects his disdain for Christianity, while the women's resilience under persecution reinforced their steadfast faith.
	Ammia (Prophetess)	fl. 100–160	Philadelphia	A prophet equal to Agabus and Philip's daughters, she is recognized for her role in Christian prophecy and leadership in Asia Minor.
	Blandina (Saint & Martyr)	c. 162– 177	Lugdunum	Blandina, a Christian slave and martyr during the persecutions of 177–178, endured severe torture, declaring, "I am a Christian." Exposed to wild beasts and a bull, she remained unharmed until her martyrdom. Her courage and faith symbolize Christian endurance and victory.
	Perpetua (Saint & Martyr)	c. 182– 203	Carthage	Christian martyr from Carthage, was persecuted under Septimius Severus. Her prison diary, The Passion of Saints Perpetua and Felicity, is one of the earliest Christian writings by a woman. Venerated as a saint, her story of resistance and devotion has profoundly influenced Christian literature.
	Felicity (Saint & Martyr)	c. 182– 203	Carthage	Christian martyr and enslaved woman, was executed with Perpetua under Septimius Severus. Imprisoned while pregnant, she prayed for an early delivery to join her companions in martyrdom. Revered for her faith and courage, she is a saint in the Catholic and Orthodox traditions, symbolizing maternal strength and devotion.
	Ammion (Presbytera)	fl. 200–210	Phrygia	Ammion the Presbytera is honored in a third-century tombstone from Uçak, Phrygia, inscribed with "Bishop Diogas in memory of Ammion the Presbytera." There is almost complete scholarly consensus that Ammion was a Christian woman presbyter, a female church officer. Scholars increasingly agree that female presbyters existed in late antiquity. Stephen Mitchell (2013, p. 196) concludes that Ammion and other leading figures in the Christian inscriptions opposed Montanism. She died in the late second century.
	Cecilia (Saint & Martyr)	c. 200– 222	Rome	Cecilia, a Christian martyr and noble Roman woman, upheld her vow of virginity despite marriage. She converted her husband, brother, and a soldier, all martyred for their faith. Cecilia survived suffocation and a failed beheading, living three more days to distribute her wealth and dedicate her home to the Church. Patron saint of musicians, her feast day is November 22.
	Agatha (Saint & Martyr)	c. 231 – 251	Catania	Christian martyr from Sicily, was born into nobility in Palermo or Catania. Known for her beauty and faith, she resisted Roman governor Quintianus' advances and refused to renounce Christianity. Tortured and miraculously healed by the Apostle Peter, she survived execution attempts, including burning, before dying in prison. Her feast day is February 5.
	Helena (Saint & Empress)	c. 246– 328	Drepanon	Wife of Emperor Constantius Chlorus, and mother of Constantine the Great, was granted the title "Augusta" for her influence. Renowned for her pilgrimage to Palestine, she built churches, promoted Christian freedom, and preserved sacred sites, leaving a lasting legacy in early Christianity.
	Lucy (Saint & Martyr)	c. 283 – 304	Syracuse	Christian virgin and martyr from Syracuse, Sicily, was born into nobility and vowed chastity and devotion to God. After distributing her wealth to the poor, she was betrayed by a suitor and persecuted under Diocletian. Despite torture, she remained faithful and was executed by sword. Patron saint of the blind, her feast day, December 13, symbolizes light and hope.
	Catherine (Saint, Virgin & Martyr)	c. 287 – 305	Alexandria	Princess and scholar, converted to Christianity at 14, inspired hundreds to follow her faith, and was martyred at 18 by Maxentius. Over a millennium later, Joan of Arc claimed Catherine appeared to her as a guiding saint.
	Euphemia (Saint & Virgin Martyr)	c. 289–303	Chalcedon	Christian martyr from Chalcedon, was celebrated for her unwavering faith during Diocletian's persecutions. Despite torture, she refused to renounce Christ. Her relics played a key role in the Council of Chalcedon (451), where her miraculous intervention affirmed orthodox faith. Venerated in the Eastern Orthodox Church, she symbolizes courage and devotion.
	Agnes (Saint & Virgin Martyr)	c. 291 – 304	Rome	Twelve year old Agnes was a Christian from a noble family but expected to marry the Roman son of a city official. She informed him that her fiancé was Jesus Christ. She was subsequently executed by a sword. She was a model for chastity and commitment to Christ. Constantine's daughter, Constantia, built a basilica, Sant'Agnese fuori le Mura, on the site of her tomb.
	Marciana (Saint & Martyr)	fl. Before 304	Mauritania	Early Christian martyr from North Africa, persecuted during the Diocletian era. Her story is detailed in the Passio Marcianae, a fifth-century text. She was exposed to wild animals, with a lion sparing her, but a bull and leopard fatally injured her. Her faith and courage under persecution symbolize the resilience of early Christians. Her martyrdom is venerated as a testament to steadfast belief.
	Nonna (Saint & Martyr)	c. 305–374	Cappadocia	Mother of Gregory of Nazianzus, was a devout Christian who influenced her husband's conversion and his rise as Bishop of Nazianzus. Her spiritual guidance shaped her children, fostering faith and piety. Nonna exemplifies the vital role of women in early Christian theology, contributing to the legacy of the Cappadocian Fathers.
	Nino (Saint & Virgin)	fl. 320–340	Cappadocia	A Christian missionary, converted Georgia to Christianity in 337 by healing Queen Nana and influencing King Mirian III. Known for her humility and vine-branch cross, she spent her final years at Mount Bodbe. Venerated as the "Equal to the Apostles," her feast day is January 14. Traditionally her lifespan was approximately from c. 280–332.
	Marcella (Saint, Teacher, & Ascetic)	c. 325– 410	Rome	Wealthy widow, embraced asceticism, teaching Scripture and theology while opposing Origenism. She protected consecrated virgins during Rome's Gothic invasion but died after being beaten. A close correspondent of Jerome, she declined to join him in Bethlehem, leaving a legacy of devotion and scholarship.
	Macrina the Younger (Virgin Saint)	c. 327–379	Caesarea	Cappadocian ascetic, chose celibacy after her fiancé's death, transforming her family estate into a proto-monastic community. Her teachings influenced her brother Basil the Great and early Christian monasticism. Gregory of Nyssa documented her life, portraying her as a prophet, teacher, and model of faith, poverty, and theological wisdom.
	Monica (Saint)	c. 331– 387	Thagaste	Devout Christian from Thagaste, endured a difficult marriage to the pagan Patricius, whose conversion she inspired. Known for her unwavering faith, she prayed fervently for her son Augustine, leading to his conversion. Venerated as the patron saint of mothers, her feast day is August 27.
	Melania the Elder (Saint & Ascetic)	c. 341– 410	Rome	Wealthy Roman aristocrat, embraced monastic life after losing her husband and children. She moved to Jerusalem, founding monasteries on the Mount of Olives and dedicating her wealth to charity and pilgrim hospitality. Balancing asceticism with aristocratic ties, she became a key figure in early Christian monasticism.
	Paula (Saint and Desert Mother)	c. 347– 404	Rome	Widowed Roman noblewoman and disciple of Jerome, became an ascetic scholar and abbess. She founded a double monastery and hostel in Bethlehem, memorized Scripture, and financed Jerome's Latin Vulgate Bible translation. Jerome dedicated many works to her, honoring her as a patron and scholar.
	Fabiola (Saint)	c. 350–399	Rome	Born in mid-4th century Rome, she was renowned for her charity and care for the sick. After public penance for remarrying, she founded one of the first Western hospitals, personally nursing the poor. Jerome praised her humility and service, securing her legacy as a saint and pioneer of nursing in the Catholic Church.
	Faltonia Betitia Proba (Christian Poet)	fl. 362	Rome	A Roman aristocrat and early Christian poet, is known for her Cento Vergilianus de laudibus Christi, which restructured Virgilian verses to narrate biblical events. A former pagan, her conversion influenced her family and led her to renounce her earlier pagan poem, Constantini bellum adversus Magnentium.
	Olympias (Saint & Deacon)	c. 368–408	Constantinople	A wealthy Christian in Constantinople, devoted her life to asceticism and charity after being widowed. Ordained a deaconess, she supported John Chrysostom, funded churches, and aided the poor. Despite political persecution, her piety and generosity left a lasting legacy, earning her sainthood in the Eastern Orthodox Church.
	Egeria (Pilgrim and Writer)	fl. 381–384	Spain or Gaul	Likely from Spain or southern Gaul, Egeria was an aristocratic woman of wealth who undertook a pilgrimage to the Holy Land, Egypt, and Mesopotamia between 381 and 384. Her Itinerarium provides an account of sacred sites and Jerusalem's liturgical year, contributing significantly to early Christian pilgrimage literature. She demonstrated curiosity and dedication to understanding biblical geography.
	Melania the Younger (Saint & Ascetic)	c. 383–439	Rome	A Roman aristocrat, embraced Christian asceticism after losing her children. Renouncing her wealth, she and her husband supported the Church, aided the poor, and founded monasteries in Jerusalem. Her life exemplifies piety and philanthropy, making her a model of early Christian devotion.
	Fritigil (Queen)	fl. 397	Marcomanni	Queen of the Marcomanni in the late 4th century, converted to Christianity after learning about St. Ambrose of Milan. She sought his guidance, strengthened her faith, and persuaded her husband to ally with Rome. Her story highlights how conversion intertwined spiritual devotion with political allegiance.
	Pulcheria (Saint & Virgin)	c. 399–453	Constantinople	Byzantine empress, championed orthodoxy during Christological controversies, supporting the title Theotokos at the Council of Ephesus (431) and the Chalcedonian definition of Christ's dual natures. She took a vow of virginity, promoted a monastic court lifestyle, and built churches dedicated to the Virgin Mary. Canonized for her Christian leadership, her feast day is September 10.
	Leontia (Saint & Martyr)	fl. Before 484	Proconsular Africa	Daughter of Bishop Germanus of Perada, was martyred at age 20 during the late 5th-century persecution of Trinitarian Christians under the Arian Vandal king Huneric in Proconsular Africa. She comforted others facing martyrdom, inspiring steadfastness in her homeland. When her son Majoricus showed fear, she strengthened him with her faith, leading him to embrace martyrdom. She was killed alongside fellow Christians, including Denise, Majoricus, Emilius, and Tertius, all enduring brutal executions for their faith. She buried at home, and she converted many to Christianity. Alongside her sister Dativa, relative Aemilius, Tertius, and Boniface of Sibida. Revered for her unwavering devotion, Leontia's relics, including a vial of her blood, are venerated in Rome's San Francesco a Ripa Church. Her feast day is December 6.

== See also ==
- List of Christian martyrs
- List of early Christian women presbyters
- Christian pacifism
- Patristics
- Persecution of Christians
- List of Augustae
- List of Eastern Orthodox saints
- Women in church history
