= Angelic Molen =

Zimbabwean Eastern Orthodox deacon

- Church: Greek Orthodox Patriarchate of Alexandria and all Africa

Orders
- Ordination: 2024 (deacon)
- Rank: Deacon

Personal details
- Born: Harare, Zimbabwe

Angelic-Phoebe Molen (born Angelic Molen in 1991) is a Zimbabwean deacon from the Greek Orthodox Patriarchate of Alexandria and all Africa. She became the first woman to be ordained deacon of the Eastern Orthodox Church.

== Life ==
Molen comes from Harare, Zimbabwe. She has been involved with the parish of St. Nektarios paris, near Harare, for many years, where she has worked in youth ministry, catechesis and with groups of mothers, which she created. Molen studies geography and environmental sciences.

On 2 May 2024, Molen was ordained the first female deacon of the Greek Orthodox Patriarchate of Alexandria and all Africa and the whole Eastern Orthodox Church by Metropolitan Seraphim (Iakovou) of the Holy Archdiocese of Zimbabwe and Angola. The ceremony took place on Holy Thursday at the St. Nektarios parish.. Because Angelic became the first deaconess, Metropolitan Seraphim elevated her to the rank of “Archdeaconess” on May 4 at the Temporal Parish of Panagia of Kykkos on the outskirts of Harare, using the relevant prayers in "Service Book of the Holy Orthodox-Catholic Apostolic Church" with name Phoebe in honor of the first-century saint Phoebe, and thus has the title of “Archdeaconess Angelic-Phoebe”. After the prayers for her elevation, she assisted Metropolitan Serafim with baptism of the parish children, a traditional role of the ancient world deaconess.

On 11 May, the Patriarchate issued a press release following her ordination, stating that "the mission in Africa needs deaconesses, especially for the pastoral work and for the baptisms of adult women". Metropolitan Seraphim stated that Molen will be responsible for the environmental initiatives of the country's parishes. Her ordination was seen as an attempt to revive the role of women deacons in the early Church.

After ordination, she "represented the Orthodox Church at many gatherings and events including the All-Africa Conference of Churches Consultation Meeting on Migration, Trafficking in Persons, and Modern Slavery and the Zimbabwe Council of Churches General Assembly. She also officially welcomed representatives from the World Council of Churches".
