= Deacon =

Office in Christian churches

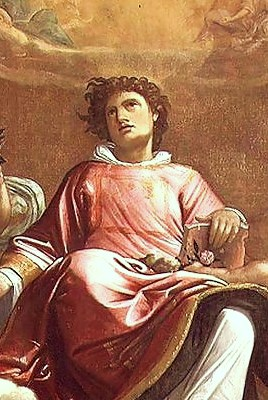
Saint Stephen, one of the first seven deacons in the Christian Church, holding a Gospel Book in a 1601 painting by Giacomo Cavedone.

A deacon (from Greek "assistant", "servant") is a member of the diaconate, an office in Christian churches that is generally associated with service of some kind, but which varies among theological and denominational traditions.

Major Christian denominations, such as the Catholic Church, the Oriental Orthodox Churches, the Eastern Orthodox Church, Lutheranism, Presbyterianism, Methodism, and Anglicanism, view the diaconate as an order of ministry. In some denominations, including the Catholic Church and Anglican churches, presbyters (priests) are first ordained as deacons before being ordained to the priesthood. Permanent deacons (or distinctive deacons) are those who do not later transition to another form of ministry, in contrast to those continuing their formation to the priesthood, who are then often called transitional deacons.

== Origin and development ==
The word deacon is derived from the Greek word diákonos (διάκονος), which is a standard ancient Greek word meaning "servant", "waiter", "minister", or "messenger". Recent research has highlighted the role of the deacon "as a co-operator" and "go-between," emphasizing their intermediary position in early Christian communities.

It is generally assumed that the office of deacon originated in the selection of seven men by the apostles, among them Stephen, to assist with the charitable work of the early church as recorded in Acts of the Apostles chapter 6. Newer research emphasizes that while the deacons' role was indeed to help, their assistance involved more liturgical, teaching and leadership functions than purely charitable work.

The Greek word diakónissa (διακόνισσα), meaning deaconess, is not found in the Bible. However, one woman, Phoebe, is mentioned at Romans 16:1–2 as a deacon or deaconess (διάκονος, diákonos) of the church in Cenchreae. Nothing more specific is said about her duties or authority, although it is assumed she carried Paul's Letter to the Romans.

Female deacons are mentioned by the Roman author Pliny the Younger in a letter to the Roman emperor Trajan dated c. 112:

I believed it was necessary to find out from two female slaves (ex duabus ancillis) who were called deacons (ministrae), what was true—and to find out through torture (per tormenta)

This is the earliest Latin text that appears to refer to female deacons as a distinct category of Christian minister.

A biblical description of the qualities required of a deacon can be found in 1 Timothy 3:1–13.

The Synod of Arles in 314 and the First Council of Nicaea denied deacons the possibility of presiding over the Eucharist even in exceptional cases. The Nicene Council ruled that deacons should not sit among the priests during the liturgy, nor should they distribute communion to them.

Among the more prominent deacons in history are:

- Stephen, the first Christian martyr (the "protomartyr")
- Philip, whose baptism of the Ethiopian eunuch is recounted in Acts 8:26–40
- Phoebe, who is mentioned in the Letter to the Romans
- Lawrence, an early Roman martyr
- Vincent of Saragossa, protomartyr of Spain
- Francis of Assisi, founder of the mendicant Franciscans
- Ephrem the Syrian
- Romanos the Melodist, a prominent early hymnographer

Prominent historical figures who played major roles as deacons and went on to higher office include Athanasius of Alexandria, Thomas Becket, and Reginald Pole. On June 8, 536, a serving Roman deacon was raised to Pope, Silverius.

The diaconate has been retained as a separate vocation in Eastern Christianity, while in Western Christianity it was largely used in cathedrals and as a temporary step along the path toward priestly ordination. In the 20th century, the diaconate was restored as a vocational order in many Western churches, most notably in the Catholic Church, the Anglican Communion, and the United Methodist Church.

== By Christian denomination ==
In the Catholic, Lutheran, Anglican, Eastern Orthodox, Oriental Orthodox, Assyrian Church of the East, and Ancient Church of the East churches, the diaconate is one of the major orders—the others being bishop, presbyter (priest), and, historically, subdeacon. Deacons assist priests in their pastoral and administrative duties, but often report directly to the bishops of their diocese. They have a distinctive role in the liturgy of the Eastern and Western Churches.

Deacons are also appointed or elected in other denominations, though this is less commonly seen as a step towards the clerical ministry. The role of deacon in these denominations varies greatly from denomination to denomination; often, there will be more emphasis on administrative duties than on pastoral or liturgical duties. In some denominations, deacons' duties are only financial management and practical aid and relief. Elders handle pastoral and other administrative duties.

=== Catholicism ===
==== Latin Church ====
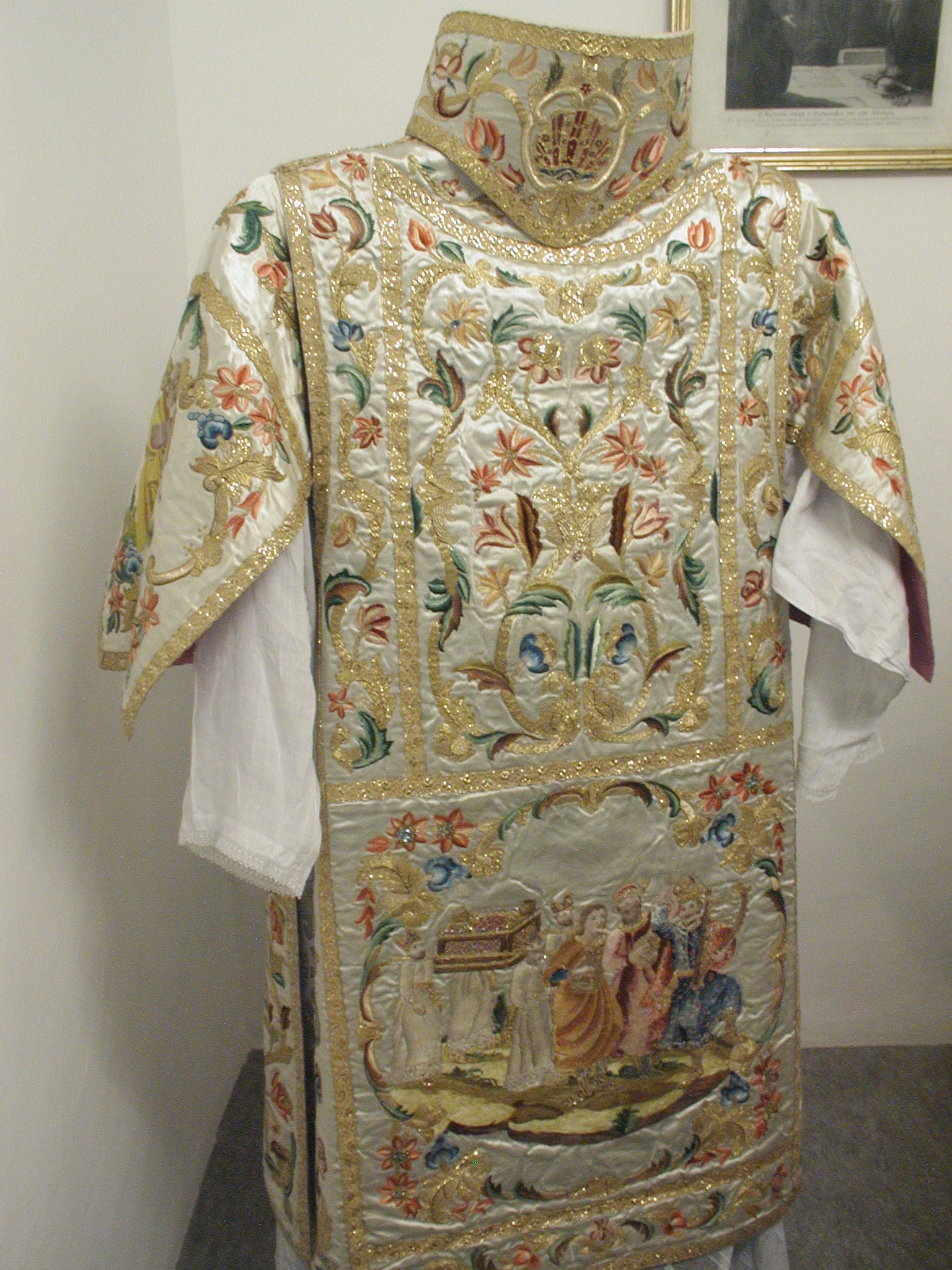
Ornately embroidered dalmatic, the proper vestment of the deacon, shown from the back with an appareled amice.

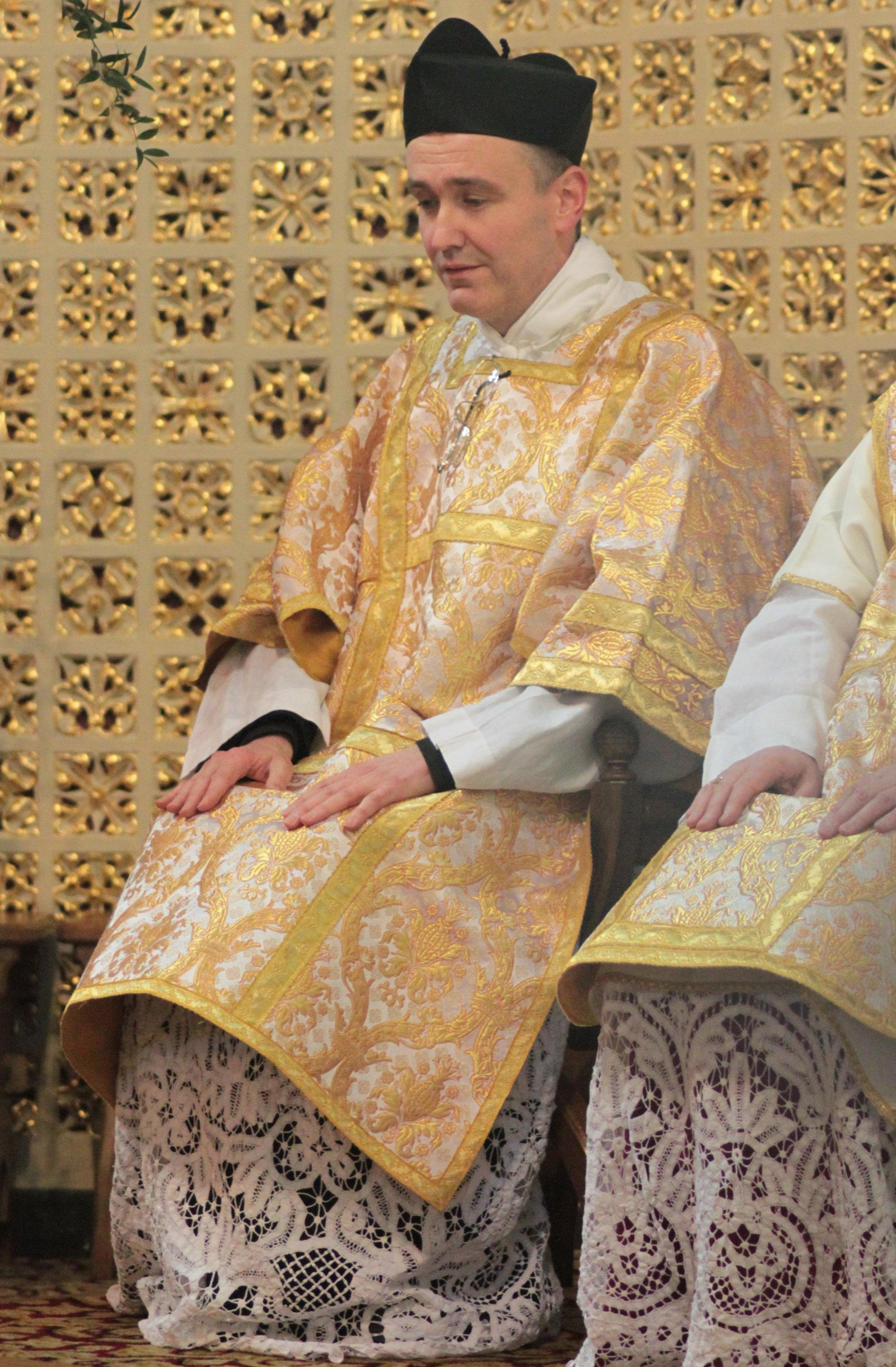
A Catholic deacon wearing his dalmatic and biretta.

Beginning around the fifth century, there was a gradual decline in the diaconate as a permanent state of life in the Latin Church. The development of a cursus honorum (sequence of offices) found men entering the clerical state through tonsure, then ordination to the minor orders of porter, lector, exorcist, and acolyte (in ascending order), before ordination to the major orders of subdeacon and deacon, all being stages on the path to priesthood. Only men destined for priesthood were permitted to be ordained deacons. As seminaries developed, following the Council of Trent, to contemporary times, the only men ordained as deacons were seminarians who were completing the last year or so of graduate theological training, so-called transitional deacons. Permanent deacons was restored as an office following the Second Vatican Council.

During the Mass, the deacon's responsibilities include assisting the priest, proclaiming the Gospel, announcing the General Intercessions, and distributing Communion. They may also preach the homily. Deacons, like priests and bishops, are ordinary ministers of the sacrament of Baptism and may witness at the sacrament of Holy Matrimony outside of Mass. Deacons may also lead funeral rites outside of Mass, such as the final commendation at the gravesite or the reception of the body at a service in the funeral home, and may assist the priest at the Requiem Mass. They can also preside over various services such as Benediction of the Blessed Sacrament, and they may give certain blessings. While in ancient history their tasks and competencies varied, today deacons cannot hear confession and give absolution, anoint the sick, or celebrate Mass.

The vestments most particularly associated with the Latin Catholic deacon are the alb, stole and dalmatic. Deacons, like priests and bishops, must wear their albs and stoles; deacons place the stole over their left shoulder and it hangs across to their right side, while priests and bishops wear it around their necks. The dalmatic, a vestment especially associated with the deacon but originating with the bishop (see below), is worn during the celebration of the Mass and other liturgical functions; its use is more liberally applied than the corresponding vestment of the priest, the chasuble. At certain major celebrations, such as ordinations, the diocesan bishop wears a dalmatic under his chasuble, now taken to signify that he enjoys the fullness of the three degrees of holy orders—deacon, priest, and bishop, but owing its origin, like the sakkos of Byzantine-rite bishops, to the court dress of the eastern Roman Empire.

The diaconate is conferred on seminarians continuing to the priesthood no sooner than 23 years of age, although there will be higher minimum ages for permanent deacons.

Deacons, like seminarians, religious, bishops and priests, pray the Liturgy of the Hours; however, deacons are usually only required to pray the morning and evening prayers.

==== Eastern Catholic Churches ====
The Second Vatican Council noted that the diaconate had fallen into disuse within the Eastern Catholic Churches, and called for its restoration where this had happened. Deacons of the Eastern Catholic Churches cannot preside at weddings, as the wedding requires the blessing of a priest to be valid, and they can only baptize in emergencies.

==== Permanent deacons ====
Following the recommendations of the Second Vatican Council and the instigation of the Josephites (whose work with African Americans necessitated increased vocational opportunity for married men), in 1967 Pope Paul VI issued the motu proprio Sacrum Diaconatus Ordinem, reviving the practice of ordaining to the diaconate men who were not candidates for priestly ordination. These men are known as permanent deacons, in contrast to transitional deacons who were continuing their priestly formation. There is no sacramental difference between the two, however, as there is only one order of deacons.

The permanent diaconate can be conferred on single men 25 or older, and on married men 35 or older, but an older age can be required by the episcopal conference. A married candidate for the permanent diaconate must have the written consent of his wife.

If a married deacon is widowed, he must maintain the celibate state. Under some very rare circumstances, however, deacons who have been widowed can receive permission to remarry. This is most commonly done when the deacon is left as a single father. In some cases, a widowed deacon will seek priestly ordination, especially if his children are grown.

The period of formation to the permanent diaconate varies from diocese to diocese as determined by the local ordinary, but it usually entails a period of prayerful preparation and several years of study. Diaconal candidates receive instruction in philosophy, theology, study of the Bible, homiletics, sacramental studies, evangelization, ecclesiology, counseling, and pastoral care and ministry before ordination.

They may be assigned to work in a parish by the diocesan bishop, where they are under the supervision of the parish priests, or in diocesan ministries. Unlike most clerics, permanent deacons who also have a secular profession have no right to receive a salary for their ministry, but many dioceses opt to remunerate them anyway.

==== Manner of address ====
A deacon is styled as "Deacon", abbreviated variously as "Dn." or "Dcn."

The proper address in written correspondence for all deacons of the Latin Church in the United States is "Deacon Name", although it is not uncommon to see "Rev. Mr." sometimes used. "Rev. Mr.", however, is more often used to indicate a transitional deacon (i.e., preparing for ordination to the priesthood) or one who belongs to a religious institute, while Rev. Deacon is used as the honorific for permanent deacons in many dioceses (e.g., Rev. Deacon John Smith, or Deacon John Smith). The decision as to whether deacons wear the Roman collar as street attire is left to the discretion of each bishop. Where clerical garb is approved by the bishop, the deacon can choose to wear or not wear the collar.

=== Eastern Orthodoxy ===
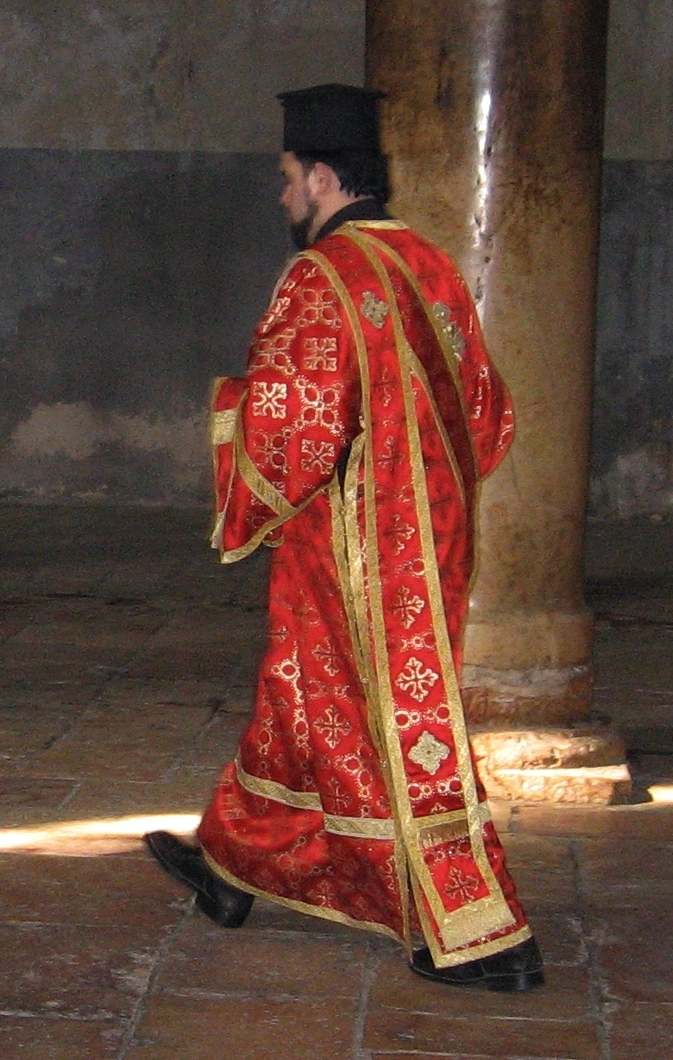
Greek Orthodox deacon in the Church of the Nativity in Bethlehem, wearing an orarion over his sticharion. On his head he wears the clerical kamilavka.

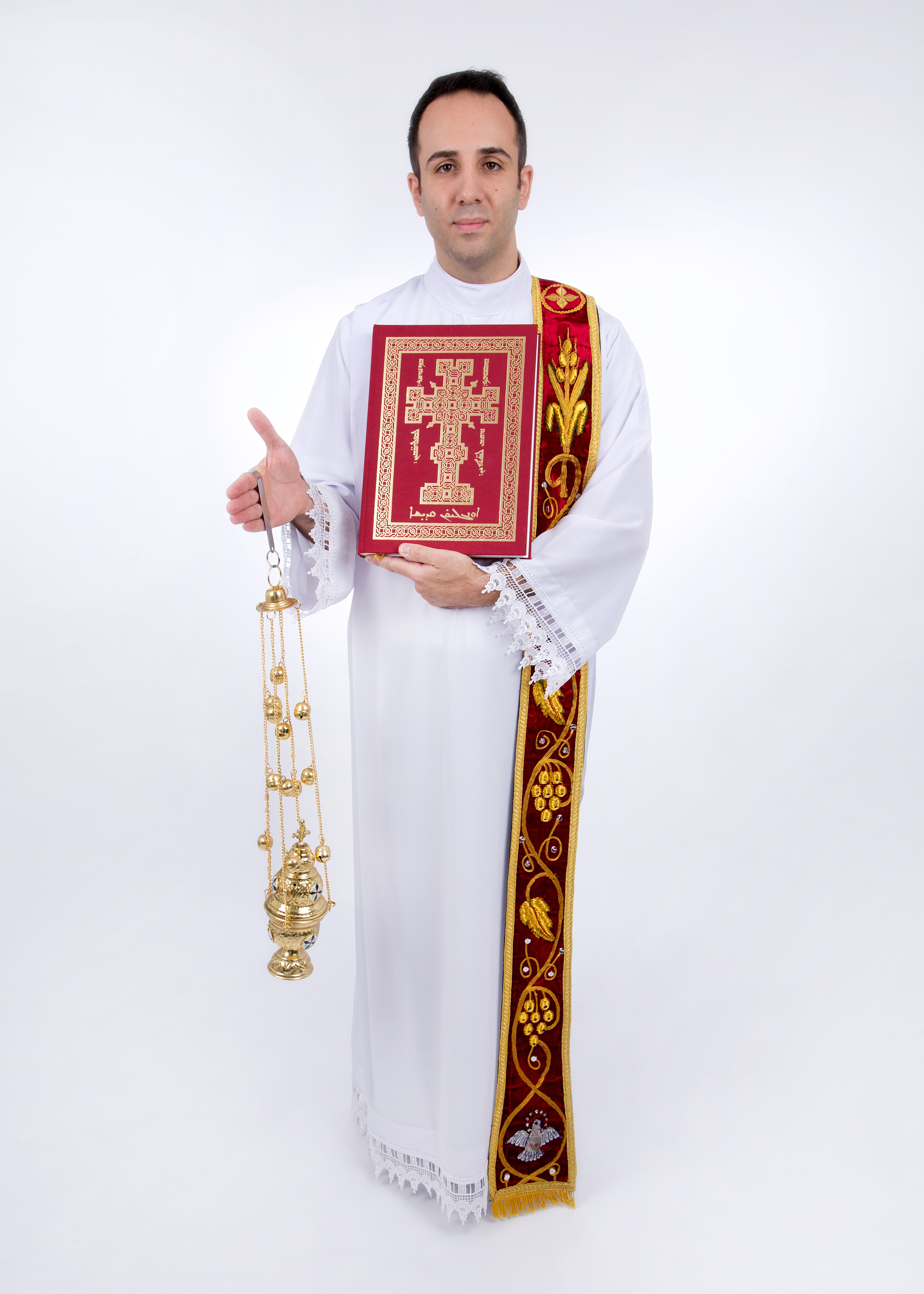
Syrian Orthodox deacon with the Orarion above the alb, a censer and the Gospel.

In addition to proclaiming the Gospel and assisting in the distribution of holy communion, the deacon censes the icons and people, calls the people to prayer, leads the litanies, and has a role in the dialogue of the anaphora. In keeping with Eastern tradition, the deacon is not permitted to perform any sacred mysteries (sacraments) on their own, except for Baptism in extremis (in danger of death), conditions under which anyone, including the laity, may baptize. When assisting at a normal baptism, it is often the deacon who goes down into the water with the one being baptized (Acts 8:38).

Diaconal vestments are the sticharion (alb, although it has come to resemble the western dalmatic), the orarion (deacon's stole), and the epimanikia (cuffs). The last are worn under the sticharion, not over it as does a priest or bishop. The deacon usually wears a simple orarion which is only draped over the left shoulder but, if elevated to the rank of archdeacon, the deacon wears the doubled-orarion, meaning it is passed over the left shoulder, under the right arm, and then crossed over the left shoulder (see photograph, right). In modern Greek practice, a deacon wears this doubled orarion from the time of their ordination. Also, in the Greek practice, a deacon wears the clerical kamilavka (cylindrical head covering) with a rim at the top. In Slavic practice, a hierodeacon (monastic deacon) wears the simple black kamilavka of a monk (without the rim), but removes the monastic veil (see klobuk) when vested; a married deacon would not wear a kamilavka unless it is given to them by the bishop as an ecclesiastical award; the honorary kamilavka is purple in colour, and may be awarded to either married or monastic clergy.

As far as street clothing is concerned, immediately following ordination a deacon receives a blessing to wear the exorasson (Arabic: Jib'be, Slavonic: riasa), an outer cassock with wide sleeves, in addition to the anterion (Slavonic: podriasnik), the inner cassock worn by all orders of clergy. In the Slavic practice, married clergy may wear any of a number of colours, but most often grey, while monastic clergy always wear black. In certain jurisdictions in North America and Western Europe, a Roman collar is often worn, although this is not a traditional or widespread practice.

A protodeacon (Ecclesiastical Greek: πρωτοδιάκονος protodiakonos, "first deacon") is a distinction of honor awarded to senior deacons, usually serving on the staff of the diocesan bishop. An archdeacon is similar, but is among the monastic clergy. Protodeacons and archdeacons use a double-length orarion even if it is not the local tradition for all deacons to use it. In the Slavic tradition a deacon may be awarded the doubled-orarion even if not a protodeacon or archdeacon.

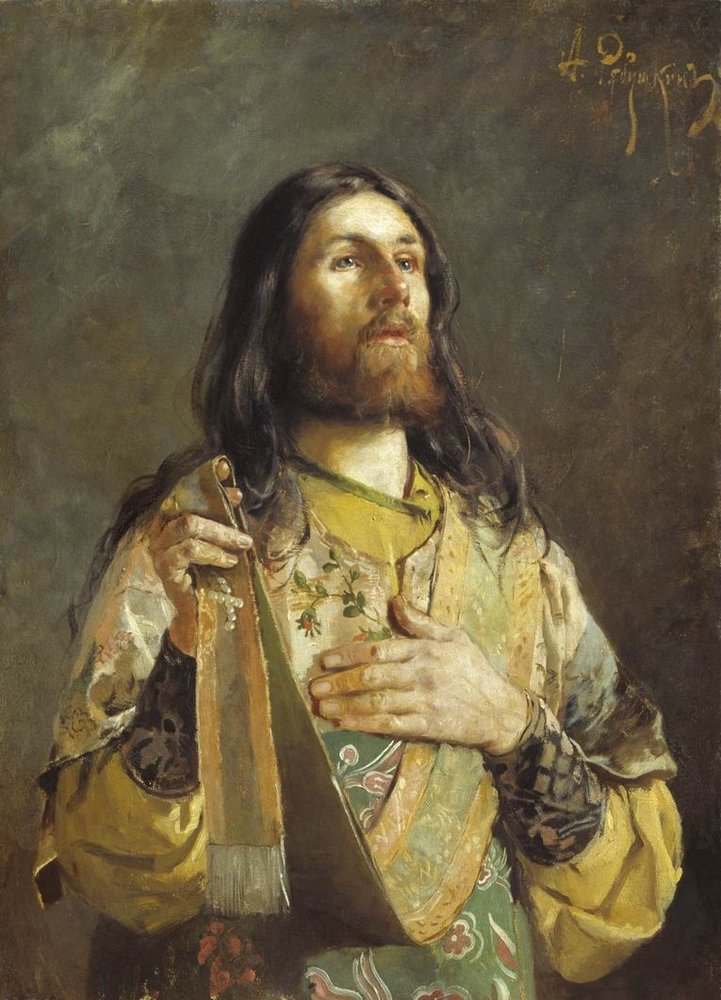
Painting of a Russian Orthodox deacon leading an ektenia (litany) by Andrei Ryabushkin (1888)

According to the practice of the Greek Orthodox Church of America, in keeping with the tradition of the Ecumenical Patriarchate, the most common way to address a deacon is "Father".

The tradition of kissing the hands of ordained clergy extends to the diaconate as well. This practice is rooted in the holy Eucharist and is in acknowledgement and respect of the Eucharistic role members of the clergy play in preparing, handling and disbursing the sacrament during the Divine Liturgy, and in building and serving the church as the Body of Christ.

=== Lutheranism ===
In the Lutheran Churches of the Scandinavian tradition, there is a threefold ministry of "bishops, priests, and deacons". Until the 1960s, deacons in the Church of Sweden were required to be celibate. For deacons, "vows made at ordination involve seeking and helping anyone in bodily or spiritual need, defending the rights of all, standing beside the oppressed, and exhorting God's people to all good works so that the love of God is made visible in the world." An ordained deacon's charism includes "visits, helps, and supports those in bodily or spiritual need; gives Christian nurture and teaching in the faith; is a sign of merciful kindness in the parish and society at large, and in all things serves Christ in the neighbour".

=== Anglicanism ===
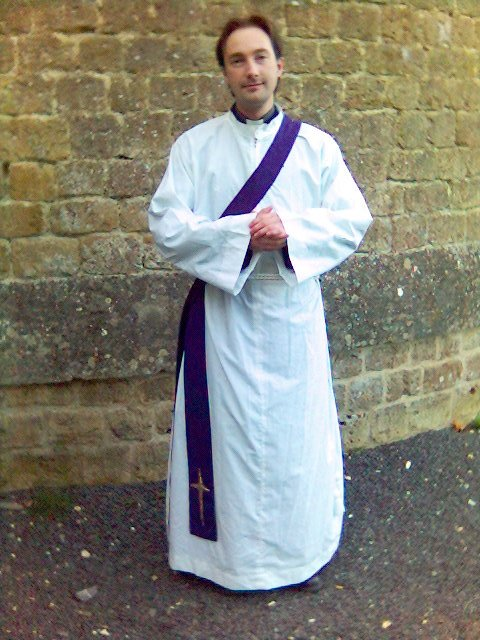
An Anglican priest vested as a deacon with an alb and a purple stole over his left shoulder

In Anglican churches, such as the Church of England and the Free Church of England, deacons are permitted to marry freely before or after ordination, as are Anglican priests. Most deacons are transitional deacons, that is, preparing for the priesthood and they are usually ordained priests about a year after their diaconal ordination. However, there are some deacons who do not go on to receive priestly ordination, recognising a vocation to remain in the diaconate. A permanent deacon is also known as a distinctive deacon, or a vocational deacon.

Many provinces of the Anglican Communion ordain both women and men as deacons. Many of those provinces that ordain women to the priesthood previously allowed them to be ordained only to the diaconate. The effect of this was the creation of a large and overwhelmingly female diaconate for a time, as most men proceeded to be ordained priests after a short time as a deacon.

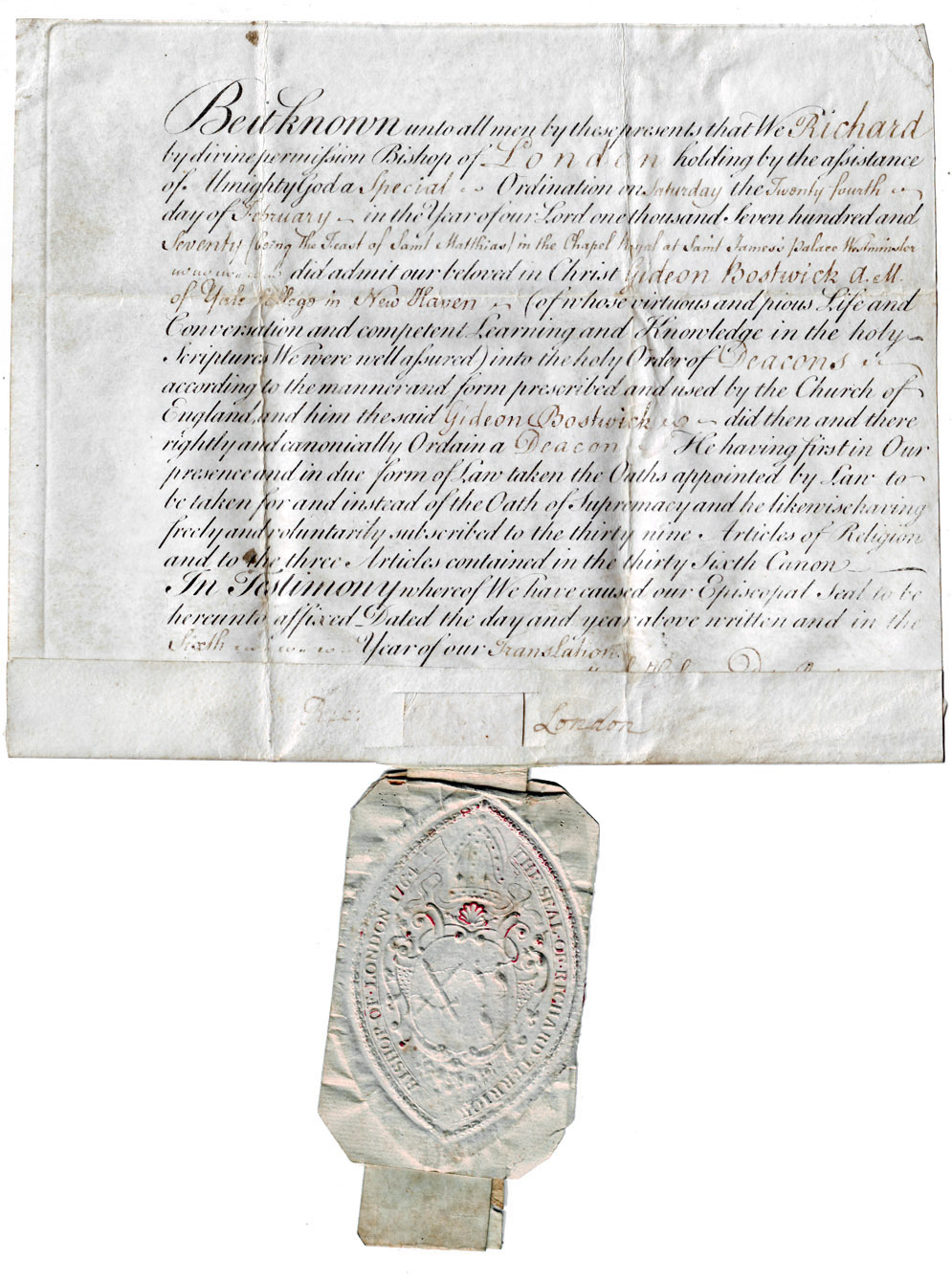
Certificate of ordination as a deacon in the Church of England given by Richard Terrick, the Bishop of London, to Gideon Bostwick. February 24, 1770

Anglican deacons may baptize and in some dioceses are granted licences to solemnize matrimony, usually under the instruction of their parish priest and bishop. Deacons are not able to preside at the Eucharist (but can lead worship with the distribution of already-consecrated communion elements where this is permitted), nor can they pronounce God's absolution of sin or pronounce the Trinitarian blessing. In most cases, deacons minister alongside other clergy.

An Anglican deacon wears an identical choir dress to an Anglican priest: cassock, surplice, tippet and academic hood. However, liturgically, deacons usually wear a stole over their left shoulder and fastened on the right side of their waist. This is worn both over the surplice and the alb. A deacon might also wear a dalmatic. Church of England deacons are supported through the CofE Network of Distinctive Deacons (CENDD). Bishop James Newcome of Carlisle is the Distinctive Deacons’ Champion in the House of Bishops.

=== Methodist churches ===
In Methodism, deacons began as a transitional order before ordination as elders (presbyters). In 1996, the United Methodist Church ended the transitional deacon and established a new Order of Deacons to be equal in status with the Order of Elders. Both men and women may be ordained as deacons. Deacons serve in a variety of specialized ministries including, but not limited to, Christian education, music, communications and ministries of justice and advocacy. Unlike United Methodist elders, deacons must find their own place of service. Nevertheless, the bishop does officially approve and appoint deacons to their selected ministry. Deacons may assist the elder in the administration of Sacraments, but must receive special approval from a bishop before presiding over Baptism and holy communion. United Methodist deacons are present in North America, Europe and Africa.

The Methodist Church of Great Britain also has a permanent diaconate—based on an understanding of the New Testament that deacons have an equal, but distinct ministry from presbyters. Deacons are called to a ministry of service and witness, and "to hold before them the needs and concerns of the world". The Methodist Diaconal Order is both an order of ministry and a religious order within the Methodist Church in Britain. It was formed in 1989 as a successor to the Wesley Deaconess Order and is open to both women and men. Diaconal ministry is one of two ordained ministries within the Methodist Church. The original Wesleyan Deaconess Order was founded by Thomas Bowman Stephenson in 1890, following observation of new ministries in urban areas in the previous years. The order continued as the Wesley Deaconess Order following Methodist Union in 1932, but, following the admission of women to "The Ministry" (as presbyteral ministry is commonly termed in the Methodist Church), a number of deaconesses transferred and recruitment for the WDO ceased from 1978. The 1986 Methodist Conference re-opened the order to both men and women and the first ordinations to the renewed order occurred during the 1990 Conference in Cardiff, which coincided with celebrations of 100 years of diaconal service in British Methodism; deaconesses had previously been ordained at their annual convocation.

The Methodist Church of Southern Africa ordains deacons who constitute a diaconal order, similar to that in the British church.

=== Reformed churches ===
==== Church of Scotland ====
There are two distinct offices of deacon in the Church of Scotland. The best-known form of diaconate are trained and paid pastoral workers. The permanent diaconate was formerly exclusively female, and it was in 1988, the centenary year of the diaconate, that men were admitted to the office of deacon. The offices of deacon and minister are now both open to both women and men; deacons are now ordained (they were previously commissioned).

The other office of deacon can be found in congregations formerly belonging to the pre-1900 Free Church of Scotland, with a Deacons' Court having responsibility for financial and administrative oversight of congregations. Only a few congregations still retain this constitutional model, with most having since adopted the Church of Scotland's Model Constitution (with a kirk session and congregational board) or Unitary Congregation (with just a kirk session). Most of the Free Church congregations united with the United Presbyterian Church of Scotland in 1900 creating the United Free Church of Scotland, which itself united with the Church of Scotland in 1929.

==== Related churches ====
The 100+ congregations of the remnant post-1900 Free Church of Scotland, alongside those of the Free Presbyterian Church, the Associated Presbyterian Churches and Reformed Presbyterian Church, continue to ordain men as both elders and deacons, with deacons (operating through a Deacons' Court) caring for the financial and property requirements of the congregation, and attending to the mercy ministry of the local church. Both elders and deacons have to subscribe to the Westminster Confession of Faith before being ordained to the office.

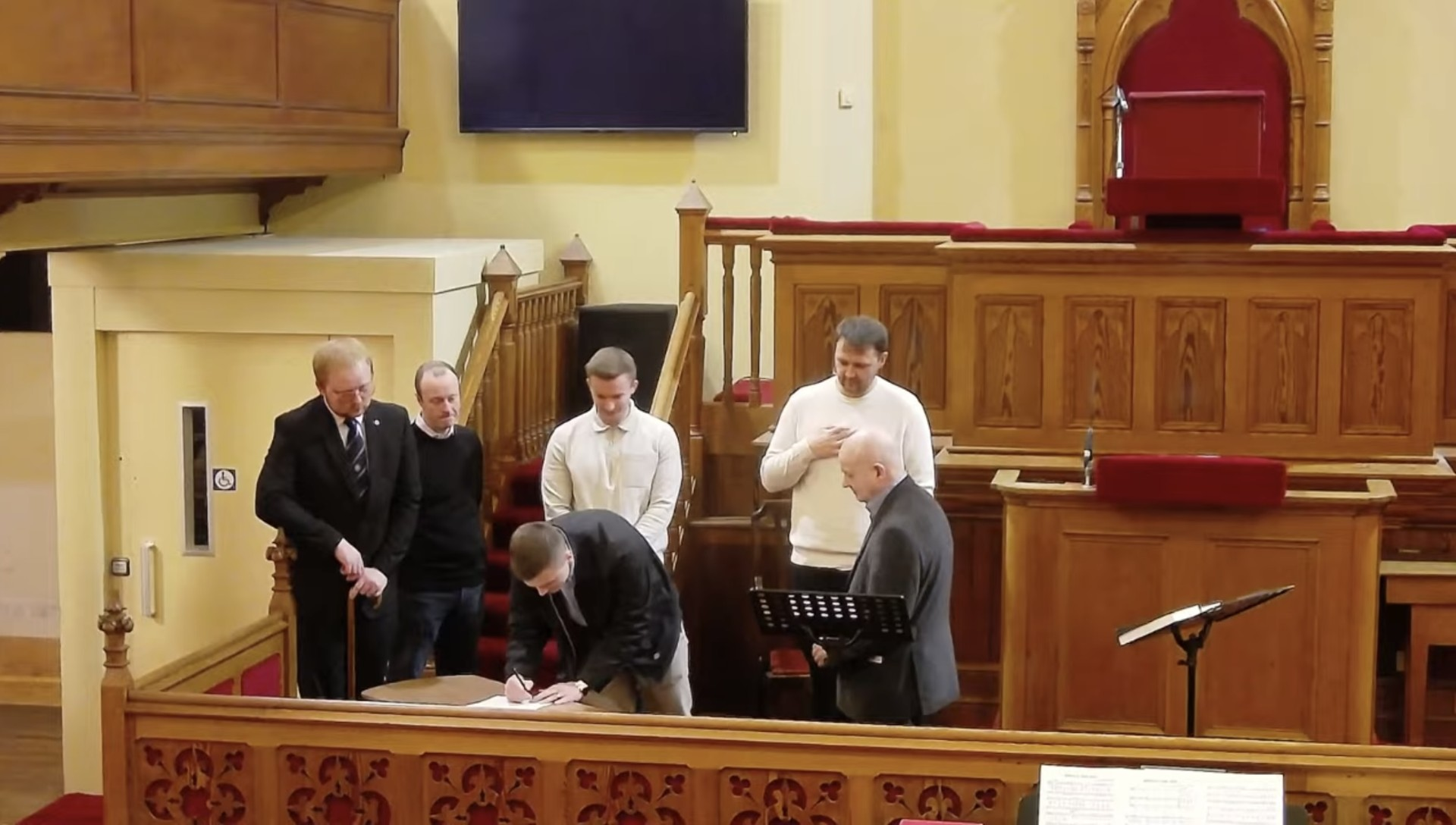
The ordination of five new deacons in a Free Church of Scotland, each signing 'The Formula', signifying his assent to the Westminster Confession of Faith, with the ordaining minister looking on.

=== Other Presbyterian churches ===
One of John Calvin's legacies was to restore the diaconate as a servant ministry. Individual congregations of the various Presbyterian denominations, such as the Presbyterian Church (USA), Presbyterian Church in America and Orthodox Presbyterian Church, also elect deacons, along with elders. However, in some churches the property-functions of the diaconate and session of elders is commended to an independent board of trustees.

==== Dutch Reformed churches ====
In many Dutch Reformed churches deacons are charged with ministries of mercy. As such, the deacons are also members of the local church council. A special feature of the Dutch Reformed churches is the fact that the diaconate of each local church is its own legal entity with its own financial means, separated from the church itself, and governed by the deacons.

==== Uniting Church in Australia ====
In the Uniting Church in Australia, the diaconate is one of two offices of ordained ministry. The other is Minister of the Word.

Deacons in the Uniting Church are called to minister to those on the fringes of the church and be involved in ministry in the community. Deacons offer leadership in a ministry of service to the world. The primary focus of the ministry of deacons is on care and compassion for the poor and oppressed and in seeking social justice for all people. They take both an active role in leadership in such actions themselves, but are also play a key role in encouraging other Uniting Church members in similar action.

Some examples of service that deacons may take include: prison chaplaincy, acting as youth or community workers, in community service agencies, in schools and hospitals, or in mission placements in Australia or overseas. Although the primary responsibility for worship in congregations lies with the Ministers of the Word, deacons have a liturgical role appropriate to their distinctive ministry, including ministries where their main leadership is within a congregation.

In the Uniting Church both ministers of the word and deacons are styled The Reverend.

The Uniting Church has recognised deacons since union, but it was not until the 6th Assembly in 1991 that the Uniting Church began ordaining deacons. This was partly because the historical, theological and sociological roles of deaconesses and deacons was being widely discussed in Churches throughout the world at the time that the Basis of Union was being drafted.

=== Anabaptist Churches ===
==== Amish ====
The Amish have deacons; they are elected by a council and receive no formal training.

==== Schwarzenau Brethren ====
===== Church of the Brethren =====
The Church of the Brethren also have deacons, as do other Brethren denominations. They are elected by the congregation to serve in ministries of compassion. They are elected for life in some congregations.

=== Baptists ===
Baptists traditionally recognize two ordained positions in the church: elders (pastors) and deacons, as per 1 Timothy 3. Some Baptist churches in the Reformed tradition recognize elder and pastor as separate offices.

Baptists have traditionally practised congregationalism, giving each church the ability to discern for themselves the interpretation of scripture. Thus, Baptist churches hold a wide variety of views on the qualifications and activities of deacons: some Baptist churches have deacons decide many of the church affairs, while others have deacons in serving roles only.

The predominant view among Baptist churches (especially theologically conservative ones, including the majority of Southern Baptist and Independent Baptist churches) is that a deacon must be a male, married (or a widower) and not divorced previously. If a deacon subsequently divorces, he must relinquish his office (but if his wife dies he may continue to serve). However, there are Baptist churches where women are allowed to be deacons or deaconesses (primarily in the United Kingdom and in the United States among African-American and theologically moderate churches). In the General Association of Regular Baptist Churches, deacons can be any adult male member of the congregation who is in good standing.

In some African American Missionary Baptist churches and in churches affiliated with the National Baptist Convention, USA, Inc. male and female deacons serve as one board. Other churches may have two separate boards of deacons and deaconesses. Most often the deacon or deacon candidate is a long-standing member of the church, being middle aged, but younger deacons may be selected from among members of a family that has had several generations in the same church. They are elected by quorum vote annually. Their roles are semi-pastoral in that they fill in for the pastor on occasion, or support the pastor vocally during his sermon. They may also lead a special prayer service, generally known as "The deacon's Prayer". Their other roles are to accompany the pastor during Communion by handing out the remembrances of bread and wine (or grape juice) and to set a good example for others to follow. Their administrative duties sometimes include oversight of the treasury, Sunday school curriculum, transportation, and various outreach ministries.

See Baptist Distinctives for a more detailed treatment of deacons in churches in other associations, particularly the UK.

=== Quakers ===
Deacons in the structure of most meetings of the Religious Society of Friends (Quakers) are called overseers. This is not an ordained role but rather a temporary ministry that is discerned every three years. They are responsible for coordinating pastoral care within a community while elders (the equivalent of the Biblical presbyterate) take care of the spiritual concerns of the meeting. Other names include "pastoral care" or "care and counsel".

=== Church of Christ ===
In accordance with Church of Christ doctrine and practice, only males may serve as deacons (deaconesses are not recognized), and must meet Biblical qualifications (generally 1 Timothy 3:8–13 is the Biblical text used to determine if a male is qualified to serve as deacon). A deacon may also be qualified to serve as an elder (and, in fact, may move into that role after a period of time if his service as deacon is considered acceptable).

The role of the deacon varies, depending on the local congregation. Generally a deacon will have responsibility for a specific non-spiritual function (e.g. finance, building and grounds, benevolence); however, the deacons (like the rest of the congregation) are under the subjection of the elders, who have spiritual and administrative authority over the deacon's function.

In congregations which lack qualified elders (where, in their absence, the men of the congregation handle leadership duties), often there also are no deacons, as they are usually appointed by the elders of the church.

=== Irvingian churches ===
==== New Apostolic Church ====
In the New Apostolic Church, the deacon ministry is a local ministry. A deacon mostly works in his home congregation to support the priests. If a priest is unavailable, a deacon will hold a divine service, without the act of communion. (Only priests and up can consecrate holy communion.)

=== Restorationist Churches ===
==== The Church of Jesus Christ of Latter-day Saints ====
The office of deacon is generally open to all 12- and 13-year-old male members of the LDS church; all are encouraged to become deacons. Duties include:

- Gather fast offerings.
- Pass the sacrament.
- Serve as the bishop's messenger.
- Care for the grounds and physical facilities of the church.
- Assist in service projects or welfare assignments as assigned by the bishop.
- Watch over the church and act as standing ministers (see D&C 84:111).
- Be involved in missionary and reactivation efforts (see D&C 20:58–59).
- Assist teachers in all their duties as needed (see D&C 20:53, 57).

==== Iglesia ni Cristo ====
Iglesia ni Cristo's deacons serve as etiquette checkers and offering collectors for males during worship services, with deaconesses as their female counterparts. In the Iglesia ni Cristo, deacons and deaconesses are usually required to be married. There are also head deacons (an exclusively male role with no head deaconess counterpart) who lead the congregation in the prayer before the sermon and the prayer for offerings. They can also be promoted to Bishops if they are faithful to the rules.

==== Jehovah's Witnesses ====
Deacons among Jehovah's Witnesses are referred to as ministerial servants, claiming it preferable to translate the descriptive Greek term used in the Bible rather than merely transliterate it as though it were a title. Appointed ministerial servants aid elders in congregational duties. Like the elders, they are adult baptized males and serve without a salary.

== Deaconesses ==
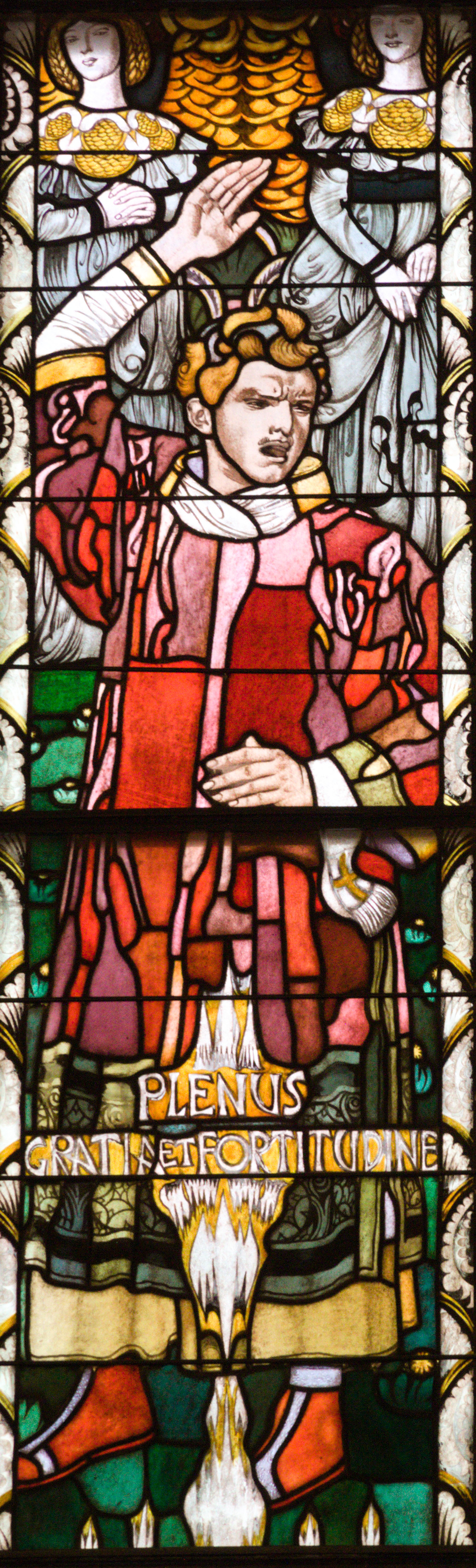
Saint Stephen, detail of the bishops and deacons windows by Józef Mehoffer in the cathedral of Fribourg

The title "woman deacon" or "deaconess" appears in many documents from the early church period, particularly in the East. Their duties were often different from that of male deacons; women deacons prepared adult women for baptism and they had a general apostolate to female Christians and catechumens (typically for the sake of modesty). Women appear to have been ordained as deacons to serve the larger community until about the 6th century in the West. Liturgies for the ordination of women deacons had similarities with as well as differences from those for male deacons. Opinions on the sacramental nature of the ordination vary: some scholars argue that the ordination of women deacons would have been equally sacramental to that of male deacons, while others say that women deacons of history were not sacramentally ordained in the full sense, as determined in the Catholic Church by Canons 1008 and 1009 of the Code of Canon Law.

The Catholic Church presently does not recognise the validity of female ordinations, be it to the diaconate or any other clerical order. In August 2016, the Catholic Church established a Study Commission on the Women's Diaconate to study the history of female deacons and to study the possibility of ordaining women as deacons.

The Russian Orthodox Church had a female subdiaconate into the 20th century.

The Armenian Apostolic Church is still ordaining religious sisters as deaconesses; its last monastic deaconess was Sister Hripsime Sasounian (died in 2007) and on 25 September 2017, Ani-Kristi Manvelian, a twenty-four-year-old lay woman, was ordained in Tehran's St. Sarkis Mother Church as the first parish deaconess after many centuries.

In 2016, the Holy Synod of the Greek Orthodox Patriarchate of Alexandria and all Africa voted to reinstate the female diaconate; in the following year, it ordained six sub-deaconesses in the Democratic Republic of Congo. In 2024 the Patriarchate ordained its first female deacon, Angelic Molen, in Zimbabwe, making her the first female deacon in the Eastern Orthodox Church.

== Cognates ==
The Greek word diakonos (διάκονος) gave rise to the following terms from the history of Russia, not to be confused with each other: "dyak", "podyachy", "dyachok", in addition to "deacon" and "protodeacon".

== Scots usage ==
In Scots, the title deacon is used for a head-workman, a master or chairman of a trade guild, or one who is adept, expert and proficient. The term deaconry refers to the office of a deacon or the trade guild under a deacon.

The most famous holder of this title was Deacon Brodie, who was a cabinet-maker and president of the Incorporation of Wrights and Masons as well as being a Burgh councillor of Edinburgh but at night led a double life as a burglar. He is thought to have inspired the story of The Strange Case of Dr Jekyll and Mr Hyde.

== See also ==
- Archdeacon
- Cardinal deacon
- Deaconess
- Diakonissa
- Protodeacon
- Subdeacon
- Gabbai
