= Elizabeth Ursic =

American theologian and scholar

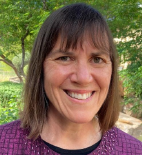
- Born: October 29, 1959 (age 66); Pittsburgh, Pennsylvania
- Education: University of Pennsylvania (BA, MBA) Yale Divinity School, (MDiv) Arizona State University, (PhD)
- Occupation: Scholar of Religion
- Employer: Mesa Community College
- Awards: Guinness World Records for long-distance tap dance
- Website: www.elizabethursic.com

Elizabeth Ursic is an American theologian, scholar, and musician recognized for her contributions to feminist theology and the study of women's spirituality. She is the author of the 2014 book Women, Ritual, and Power: Placing Female Imagery of God in Christian Worship which analyzes how contemporary Christian congregations engage with a female concept of God. She is a professor of Religious Studies at Mesa Community College in Arizona. In addition to her work as a scholar of religion, she chaired the Women's Caucus of the American Academy of Religion for a decade. Ursic twice held the Guinness World Records for tap-dancing 13.1 miles during a marathon, a record which has been noted by Sports Illustrated.

== Early life ==
Elizabeth Ursic was born in Pittsburgh on October 29, 1959. Her parents, Margaret Volk and John Ursic, were first-generation Slovenian Americans. She has a one sibling, a sister, Kathy. The family was raised in a Catholic background. She lived briefly in Argentina as a small child; however, the majority of Elizabeth's childhood was spent in Greenwich, Connecticut. She studied piano and cello while in elementary school. Her interests in music continued in high school where she conducted choirs and bands.

== Education ==
She was admitted to the University of Pennsylvania where she aimed to complete a double major in Business and Music. However, after the university's dual major with music fell apart, she completed both a bachelor's degree in marketing and a bachelor's degree in communications. After college, she worked at Westinghouse and AT&T for two years each.

She earned an MBA from the Wharton School of Business with a focus on International Relations. While completing her MBA, Ursic continued to foster her interests in music and dance. After completing her MBA, Ursic traveled to Spain where she started practicing meditation. She maintained her meditation practice while working for Touche Ross in Miami. In the late 1980s, she moved to Sedona, Arizona to deepen her interest in spirituality. While in Sedona, with exposure to musicians from around the world, she also expanded her musical horizons and began creating and performing New Age music.

In 1994 she moved to Ridgecrest, California where the desert environment deepened her spiritual practice. While living in California, Ursic became interested in and inspired by Hildegard of Bingen. Feeling connected to Hildegard's music, Ursic's interest in Catholic mysticism intensified. Ursic went on a retreat to Medjugorje and on pilgrimages to Lourdes, Fatima, and Santiago. Although Ursic struggled to reconcile the universality of her mysticism with Catholicism, her experiences while on pilgrimage led her to seek a return to her Catholic roots.

After returning from her pilgrimages, Ursic moved to Hawaii where she taught courses at Maui Community College for a year. However, Ursic left the position after a year to move home to Connecticut to help take care of her father. There she began to work at a local Catholic Church. While working in her local parish, Ursic pursued a Master of Divinity from Yale Divinity School, a degree that she earned in 2003. Her studies were supported by a fellowship from the Yale Institute of Sacred Music. At Yale Divinity, she focused on images of Wisdom as a woman in the Hebrew Scriptures. After her position at the parish ended, she worked briefly at Sacred Heart University until landing a full-time position teaching religious studies at Mesa Community College in 2003. In 2010 she completed her Ph.D. in Religious Studies at Arizona State University. Her dissertation concentrated on women's spirituality and the use of feminine imagery in Christian worship.

== Career ==
Ursic began teaching religious studies at Mesa Community College in 2003. Ursic teaches classes on religion, gender, religion and art, and other topics. She has worked as an adjunct at the California Institute of Integral Studies and has served as a spiritual director for the Franciscan Renewal Center in Scottsdale, Arizona. She has had visiting roles at the University of Edinburgh and in Auroville, India. She is actively involved with the American Academy of Religion (AAR) and the Society for Biblical Literature (SBL). She served as co-chair of the AAR-SBL Women's Caucus from 2013 to 2023.

Ursic also works as a musician. She has produced two albums—an album of New Age music, Unspoken Truth (1995), and an album of instrumental music, Gratitude (2019). She composes for and performs with numerous instruments including cello, piano, synthesizer, lap harp, ukulele, and voice. Ursic provided a virtual concert for Arizona State University during the COVID-19 pandemic. The concert was later streamed on YouTube. The performance includes remarks about music, the role of music in Christianity and spirituality, and the connections between music and her life. Ursic also wrote a piece of music for a 2017 art piece entitled Women Dancing with Gaia based on the writings of Ivone Gebara and Rosemary Radford Ruether. Ursic's music reflected on concepts of ecofeminist theology and she acknowledged Rosemary Radford Reuther as an influence on her work.

Along with Colleen Hartung, Elizabeth Ursic was foundational in the launch of the Women in Religion WikiProject.

== Personal life ==
After meeting Frank Nightingale, whom she married on November 18, 2023, Ursic began attending the Episcopal Church. She broke the Guinness World Records in long-distance tap dance twice, once in 1986 and again in 1993. That same year she was featured in an issue of Sports Illustrated for tap dancing 13.1 miles during a half-marathon in Arizona.

== Influence ==
Her book Women, Ritual, and Power: Placing Female Imagery of God in Christian Worship (2014) examines how incorporating female depictions of the divine can transform worship practices and empower communities. A review of the book recognizes the work as "important" and observes that it is a "call for action" to incorporate more female imagery in Christian religious rituals. Similarly, in a critical engagement with the with Ursic's article. "Bi the Way: Rethinking Categories of Religious Identity," Heather Shipley commended Ursic's work (suggesting the use of "bi" and "trans" to describe religious status) for enhancing "the ways that religious identity is conceptualized." Protestant theologian Mary McClintock Fulkerson of Duke Divinity School called it "an important contribution to the theological world," noting "As she displays how gender is understood in Christian worship with evidence that some churches do include feminist imagery, the continuing presence of patriarchy is also revealed." Ursic also showed how worshipers attempting to incorporate women's spirituality could even be harassed and threatened by their congregations, such as the case of what Carol P. Christ characterized as "a vicious campaign within the United Methodist Church" to discredit two of its members studying Sophia, the feminine personification of holy wisdom.

Ursic continues to contribute to academic conferences, journals, and workshops, promoting a more inclusive approach to theology and worship practices. She has been an active member of the Women's Alliance for Theology, Ethics, and Ritual and chaired the Women's Caucus of the American Academy of Religion for ten years. She is a board member of the Arizona Interfaith Movement.

== Selected publications ==
- Ursic, Elizabeth. Women, Ritual, and Power: Placing Female Imagery of God in Christian Worship. State University of New York Press, 2014. ISBN 1-438-45286-1
- Ursic, E. (2014). Bi the Way: Rethinking Categories of Religious Identity. The International Journal of Religion and Spirituality in Society, 3(4), 29.
- Ursic, Elizabeth. "The Impact of Female Divine Imagery in Christian Worship." In Feminism and Religion: How Faiths View Women and Their Rights, edited by Michele Paludi, Praeger, 2016.
- Ursic, Elizabeth. "Music as a Pathway to the Divine Feminine." Journal of Feminist Studies in Religion, vol. 29, no. 2, 2013, pp. 45–62.
