= Theosebia =

4th-century Anatolian Christian leader

Saint Theosebia

Deaconess
- Born: 4th century Cappadocia
- Died: c. 381
- Venerated in: Catholic Church; Eastern Orthodox Church; Anglicanism
- Feast: 10 January

Saint Theosebia (Greek: Θεοσέβεια Theosebeia), also known as Theosebia the Deaconess, was a 4th-century Christian leader, who is honored as a saint in the Eastern Orthodox Church. In the Catholic Church, she is referred to as Blessed Theosebia the Deaconess. She has also been referred to as a Presbyter.

== Life ==
Much mystery surrounds the life of Theosebia. Her year of birth is unknown and her death date uncertain, though probably subsequent to 381. However, she is thought to have played an important role in the church in Nyssa, where she was a deaconess or presbyter.

Gregory Nazianzen wrote a letter of condolence on her death to Gregory of Nyssa in which Gregory Nazianzen mentioned "your sister Theosebia" and "true yoke-fellow of a priest". This has caused some debate regarding the ambiguous manner in which she is identified. Some historians supposed Theosebia was the wife of Gregory of Nyssa, others suppose she was one of his sisters like Macrina the Younger. If so, then Theosebia was the sister of Basil the Great as well.

Gregory of Nyssa — unlike the other Cappadocian Fathers — was married, according to his own testimony in his work On Virginity that he could not benefit from the subject of his own work. This, combined with Nazianzen's statement that Theosebia was buried by the other Gregory in the aforementioned letter, suggest that she was either Gregory of Nyssa's wife or sister, whose funeral he would have been obliged to oversee.

The Cappadocian Gregory of Nazianzus wrote to Gregory of Nyssa about Theosebia, “the pride of the church, the ornament of Christ, the finest of our generation, the free speech of women, Theosebia, the most illustrious among the brethren, outstanding in beauty of soul. Theosebia, truly a priestly personage, the colleague of a priest, equally honored and worthy of the great sacraments." This comment, according to some scholars, such as Ilaria Ramelli and Joan E. Taylor, is evidence that Theosebia was a presbyter (priest) herself.

== Legacy ==
The St Theosevia Centre for Christian Spirituality is in Oxford, although using an alternate spelling, is named after Theosebia. Donald Allchin was director of the centre from 1987 to 1994.

== Bibliography ==
- Ramelli, Ilaria. "Theosebia: A Presbyter of the Catholic Church" in Journal of Feminist Studies in Religion; Vol. 26, Nº 2 (Fall 2010), pp. 79–102
