= Gary Macy =

American professor and theologian

Gary Allan Macy
- Born: 1950 (age 75–76)
- Education: Marquette University (H.B.A., M.A.); University of Cambridge (Ph.D.)
- Occupations: Theologian, Historian
- Years active: 1977–2017
- Organization(s): University of San Diego; Santa Clara University
- Known for: Historical studies on the Eucharist; Women's ordination in the medieval church
- Notable work: The Hidden History of Women’s Ordination; The Theologies of the Eucharist in the Early Scholastic Period
- Awards: Herodotus Fellow, Institute for Advanced Study (1991–1992); Senior Luce Fellow, National Humanities Center (2005–2006); Associated Church Press Award, Best Fictional Humor (1984)

Gary Allan Macy (born 1950) is an American theologian and historian specializing in medieval Christianity, liturgy and the history of women's ordination in the Western Church. He was professor emeritus of Theology at Santa Clara University, where he held the John Nobili, S.J. Professorship of Theology from 2007 to 2017. During his tenure, he also served as chair of the Department of Religious Studies (2011 - 2015) and director of the Graduate Program in Pastoral Ministries (2013 - 2017). Macy is best known for his book The Hidden History of Women's Ordination: Female Clergy in the Medieval West, which explores the historical presence and later marginalization of ordained women in medieval Christianity.

== Education and academic career ==
Macy received his Honors Bachelor of Arts and Master of Arts degrees from Marquette University. He completed his Doctor of Philosophy in Divinity at the University of Cambridge in 1978.

He began his academic career at the University of San Diego in 1978, where he served as professor and chair of the Department of Religious Studies and acting associate graduate dean. In 2007, he joined Santa Clara University, where he held various academic and administrative positions, including chair of the Department of Religious Studies and director of the Graduate Program in Pastoral Ministries. He has also held visiting appointments at Marquette University and the University of Notre Dame.

While serving as Director of Santa Clara University's Graduate Program in Pastoral Ministries (2013–2017), Macy oversaw the expansion of the program's course delivery methods. Under his leadership, the program added hybrid formats combining in-person weekend sessions at diocesan sites with online components, alongside traditional on-campus offerings. This expansion aimed to make the program more accessible to students in other dioceses throughout California.

== Research and publications ==
Macy is widely recognized for his work on the historical development of the Eucharist and sacramental theology in the Middle Ages. His early work, The Theologies of the Eucharist in the Early Scholastic Period (1984), explored doctrinal developments in medieval Eucharistic theology in their political and social setting.

His 2007 book, The Hidden History of Women’s Ordination: Female Clergy in the Medieval West argues that the definition of ordination changed over time and that historical evidence shows women held clerical roles in the early and medieval church. The book received scholarly attention for its re-examination of medieval sources and its implications for contemporary debates on women's ordination.

Macy has also co-authored and edited several influential volumes, including A Companion to the Eucharist in the Middle Ages in 2012 with Ian Levy and Kristin Van Ausdall, Christian Symbol and Ritual: An Introduction with Bernard Cooke, and Women Deacons: Past, Present, Future with Phyllis Zagano and William Ditewig.

He has published over thirty scholarly articles on topics such as medieval theology, ecclesiology and liturgical history. Macy's work has been translated into several languages including German, French, Spanish, Japanese, Italian and Portuguese.

== Selected works ==
=== Books ===
- The Theologies of the Eucharist in the Early Scholastic Period (1984)
- The Banquet's Wisdom: A Short History of the Theologies of the Lord's Supper (1992)
- Christian Symbol and Ritual: An Introduction (with Bernard Cooke, 2005)
- The Hidden History of Women's Ordination: Female Clergy in the Medieval West (2007)
- Women Deacons: Past, Present, Future (with Phyllis Zagano and William Ditewig, 2012)
- A Companion to the Eucharist in the Middle Ages (co-editor, 2012)
- Treasures from the Storehouse: Essays on the Medieval Eucharist (1999)

=== Articles ===
- The Ordination of Women in the Early Middle Ages, Theological Studies (2000)
- Heloise, Abelard and the Ordination of Abbesses, Journal of Ecclesiastical History (2006)
- The Dogma of Transubstantiation in the Middle Ages, Journal of Ecclesiastical History (1994)
- Demythologizing 'the Church' in the Middle Ages, Journal of Hispanic/Latino Theology, 3 (1995): 23–41. (Essay of the Year Award, College Theology Society, 1995)

== Honors and recognition ==
Macy has received numerous academic honors, including:

- John Nobili, S.J. Chair of Theology, Santa Clara University (2007–2017)
- Senior Luce Fellowship, National Humanities Center (2005–2006)
- Herodotus Fellowship at the Institute for Advanced Study in Princeton (1991–1992)
- Book of the Year, College Theology Society (1993)
- Associated Church Press Award, Best Fictional Humor (1984)
- American Philosophical Society Franklin Grant in 2023 and 2026.
