= Boff =

Boff may refer to:

== People ==
- Andrew Boff (born 1958), British politician
- Boff Whalley (born 1961), British guitarist and playwright
- Clodovis Boff (born 1944), Brazilian Roman Catholic theologian, philosopher, writer, and professor; brother of Leonardo
- Leonardo Boff (born 1938), Brazilian theologian, philosopher, writer, and former Catholic priest; brother of Clodovis

== Other ==
- A shortened version of the word Boffin
- Boffing, a term for sparring with foam weapons
- Sam on Boffs' Island, a British educational television series in the 1970s
