= José María Vigil (theologian) =

Latin American theologian

José María Vigil Gallego (born 22 August 1946) is a Latin American theologian who has played a significant role in the fields of liberation theology and spirituality, the theology of religious pluralism and the emergence of new paradigms. He has been a Claretian missionary since 1964 and a Catholic priest since 1971. He is a naturalised Nicaraguan and currently lives in Panama. He is known for his numerous writings, his editorial and online activity, his service to the Association of Theologians of the Third World (EATWOT), the coordination of Koinonia Services and the International Latin American Agenda, his theology of religious pluralism and, in recent years, his contributions to a ”new paradigms” theological perspective.

== Biography ==
Born in Zaragoza, Spain on 12 August 1946, he became a naturalized Nicaraguan in Managua in 1988. He has lived and worked in Latin America since the early 1980s. He completed abaccalaureate at the Colegio La Salle in Zaragoza. He became a member of the Claretian Missionaries in 1964, studied philosophy (1965–1967) in Segovia, and theology (1968- 1971) in the Claretian Hispano-American Theologate of Salamanca, and was ordained priest in that city in 1971.

He published his first article in 1969 (in the Diario de León), and his first book in 1975, in Valencia (Spain), EDICEP publishing house. Since then he has published several hundred articles in theological and pastoral magazines and newspapers. He spent thirteen years in Nicaragua, where he became a Nicaraguan citizen. He worked in the Theological and Communications Department of the CAV, Centro Ecuménico Antonio Valdivieso, whose magazine Amanecer he directed for a time. He was involved in pastoral work with grassroots communities in Managua and in rural communities in various parts of the country, especially Estelí.

In 2006, at the General Assembly in Johannesburg, South Africa, he was elected coordinator of the “Latin American Theological Commission” for the five-year period 2006–2011, during which time this commission also served on the International Theological Commission of the Ecumenical Association of Third World Theologians (EATWOT). In 2011 he was re-elected to the same position for the period 2011–2016.

Since 1987 José María participated in meetings with the theologian authors of the famous collection of liberation theology, guided by Vozes publishers of Petropolis, Brazil, until the collection was blocked by Cardinal Ratzinger from the Vatican "Congregation for the Doctrine of Faith". He continued participating for many years in the group of theologians Amerindia.

He is an active member of the International Council of "WFTL" (World Forum on Theology and Liberation). He participated from the beginning (2001) in the joint presence of liberation theology in the World Social Forum.

== Academic formation ==
José María graduated in Systematic Theology at the Pontifical University of Salamanca (September 1972), obtaining his degree in Systematic Theology at the University of St. Thomas (Angelicum, Rome, 1974). He began studies in Clinical Psychology at the School of Psychology of the Pontifical University of Salamanca, finishing his degree in psychology at the UCA, Central American University of Managua (1992). He holds a PhD in education with a specialization in pedagogical mediation from the Universidad La Salle de San José de Costa Rica (2008), with a personal emphasis on New Paradigms. In 2013 he was invited to and made a post-doctoral work in Religious Sciences at the Pontifical Catholic University of Belo Horizonte (2013) in Belo Horizonte, Brazil.

== Principal occupations ==
Professor of Theology at the Regional Center for Theological Studies of Aragon (CRETA), of the Pontifical University of Salamanca, in the 70s and 80s, and in the Central American University of Managua (UCA) during the 80s and 90s.

Since 1992, together with Pedro Casaldáliga, he has published annually the Agenda LatinoAmericana in 18 countries and 5 languages on average.

He has directed the anthology series: «Along the many ways of God» (Abya Yala, Quito, Ecuador), with the participation of more than 70 theologians. For its broad comprehension of contents and authors this is the prime Latin American work on the subject. The five-volume series was published simultaneously in four languages: Spanish, Portuguese, Italian and English.

He has been "theologically active" on the internet heading-up the team of Koinonia Services, which he founded in April 1993. It is the oldest website on the network to offer on-line a Spanish biblical service and a theological journal.

Since 2006 he coordinates the Latino-American Theological Commission of EATWOT, "The Ecumenical Association of Third World Theologians" (also known in Latin America as ASETT); this Latin American Theological Commission also is serving during the last two periods as International Theological Commission of EATWOT. He was for two terms (2006–2018) general editor of "VOICES of the Third World" – the digital theological magazine EATWOT makes available to the general public.

With the same publisher – Editorial Abyayala, Quito (Ecuador) – directs the "Axial-Time Collection" which publishes "avant garde" themes e.g. new paradigms: the modern paradigm, the “religious-pluralist vision”; the baffling perspectives opened by quantum physics, “multi-culturalism”, process-philosophy, pos-theistic and pos-religious paradigms, the new epistemology, the new paradigm of biblical archaeology, etc.

José María has been the Invited Professor to courses, conferences and symposia in various Latin American universities, such as the Xaveriana in Bogota Colombia, the UNISINOS of São Leopoldo in Brazil, the Catholic University of Belo Horizonte in Brazil, the National University of Costa Rica, ITESO of Guadalajara in Mexico and the system of Jesuit universities also in Mexico, the Methodist University of São Paulo in Brazil, and the Universidad Iberoamericana in Mexico, among others.

He has also been the invited speaker giving the lecture at many courses or international events, such as the international "Courses for empowering" for formators, organized by the CONFER of Peru (2011–2015) and the CIRM of Mexico (2015); the Multicultural Dialogue in Guadalajara, Mexico (2015); Regional Meetings of CEB's in Latin America, and the Congress of the Popular Christian Communities of Spain; the Christian d'Avui Forum (Valencia, Spain, 2013); the International Buddhist-Christian Conference (New York, Theological Union Seminary, 2013); the Religious Forum in Vitoria Spain 2014... among others.

== Intellectual theological itinerary ==
Entering into an adult theological life with the enthusiasm of the Second Vatican Council (1975) and its refurbishing theology, to which had dedicated the early years of his ministry, José María soon discovered the emerging Latin American "Liberation Theology" of the 1975's. This enthralled him and led to his being transplanted to Latin America, where he has since lived and been employed. From the privileged vantage point of "The Revolutionary Nicaragua" he accompanied the avant-garde militant Liberation Theology, the grassroots communities and the Church of the poor, working closely with his friend and claretian companion Pedro Casaldáliga.

With the arrival of so-called globalization in the 1990s, and in the third stage of his intellectual journey, José María also entered the theological field of "religious pluralism", a new branch of theology in which he has been one of the outstanding Latin Americans authors. Maintaining himself within the theology and the paradigm of liberation, he went on to adopt the well-known "Latin American methodology" (see > judge > act) that appears in many of his writings. His book "Theology of Religious Pluralism"—A systematic course in popular theology—has been hailed by Paul Knitter as the most representative Latin American book on "The Theology of Religious Pluralism", and has been published in Spanish, Portuguese, English, Italian and German.

The book is written not only vis á vis the academy but also exhibits a strong pedagogical substance making it suitable to be used in the formation of Christian communities. The book advocates a "pluralistic re-reading of Christianity." This of course earned for him a doctrinal indictment by two Spanish bishops, and being taken before the Commission for the Doctrine of the Faith of the Spanish Episcopal Conference. The up-shot of it all ultimately led to the imposition on José María of three years public silence (time now served-out) by the Vatican Congregation for the Doctrine of the Faith.

Since participating in the 2009 CLAR General Congress in Bogotá, José María has studied the sciences of religion. This work focuses on epistemological changes in culture and the paradigms within the sciences of religion that relate to religions and spirituality.

== Books ==
- ¿Qué queda de la opción por los pobres?, en: Christus 58 (1993) 6 [667], 7–19 y en: RELaT 6
- La opción por los pobres. Evaluación crítica, en: RELaT 112;
- ¿Cambio de paradigma en la Teología de la Liberación?, en: RELaT 177
- Teología del pluralismo religioso. Curso sistemático de Teología Popular, Editorial Abya Yala, Quito, Ecuador 2005, 389 pp. Ediciones El Almendro, Córdoba (España) 2005, 389 pp. En: Atrio, por capítulos, en Scribd y en Academia.edu
- Escritos sobre Teología del Pluralismo 1992–2012. Libros Digitales Koinonía, y Academia.edu.
- Bajar de la cruz a los pobres: cristología de la liberación (organizador), Panama 2007. ISBN 978-9962-00-209-3. PDF en Servicios Koinonía y en Academia.edu.
- La política de la Iglesia apolítica. Una aportación a la teología política desde la historia. Edicep. Valencia 1975, 225 pp. PDF
- Vivir el Concilio. Guía para la animación conciliar de la comunidad cristiana, Paulinas, Madrid 1985, 238 pp. PDF
- María de Nazaret. Materiales pastorales para la comunidad cristiana, Paulinas, Madrid 1985, 172 pp. PDF
- Plan de pastoral prematrimonial. Orientación y materiales, Sal Terrae, Santander 1988, 285 pp. PDF
- Junto con Pedro Casaldáliga: Espiritualidad de la liberación. Ediciones en: Ediciones Envío, Managua 1993, 284 pp PDF; Verbo Divino, Quito 1992, 290 pp; Paulinas, Bogotá 1992, 290 pp; Sal Terrae, Santander 1992, 21993, 287 pp; CRT, México 1993, 283 pp; Lascasiana, Guatemala 1993, 283 pp; Guaymuras, Tegucigalpa 1993, 358 pp; Amigo del Hogar, Santo Domingo 1993, 315 pp; Conferre, Santiago de Chile 1993, 283 pp; Nueva Tierra, Buenos Aires, junio 1993, 284 pp; UCA Editores, San Salvador 1993, 287 pp.; Talleres Claret, La Ceiba (Honduras) 1993, 172 pp, en: RELaT. In English: Burn & Oates, London, 1994, ISBN 086012 215 8, en: Academia.edu.
- Sobre la Opción por los pobres, J.M. Vigil (org.), con Leonardo Boff, Pedro Casaldáliga, Víctor Codina, Giuglio Girardi, Julio Lois, Albert Nolan, Jorge Pixley, Jon Sobrino. Ediciones en: Sal Terrae (colección «Presencia teológica» nº 64), Santander 1991, 165 pp; Nicarao, Managua 1991, 151 pp; Sal Terrae, Santander 1991, 165 pp; Rehue, Santiago de Chile 1992, 139 pp; Paulinas, Bogotá 1994, 145 pp. PDF
- Aunque es de noche. Hipótesis psico-teológicas sobre la crisis espiritual de América Latina en los 90, Editorial Envío, Managua, 1996, 191 pp. PDF
- Todas las Agendas Latinoamericanas desde 1992 a 2016. También en Academia.edu.

== Significant articles ==
- Valor salvífico de las religiones indígenas (1992). En: RELaT
- Originalidad cristiana de la Iglesia Latinoamericana (1992). En: RELaT
- La opción por los pobres es opción por la justicia y no es preferencial. En: RELaT y Academia.edu.
- Vida religiosa: lecciones de la historia (1994). En: RELaT
- Vida religiosa: ¿parábola o hipérbole (1995). En: RELaT
- Creer como Jesús: la espiritualidad del Reino. Elementos fundantes de la espiritualidad latinoamericana (1996). En: RELaT
- Desafíos de la teología del pluralismo a la fe tradicional (2005). En: RELaT
- Un vademécum para el ecumenismo (2004). En: RELaT y en Academia.edu.
- Desafíos más hondos a la vida religiosa (2004). En: RELaT y en Academia.edu.
- Crisis de la vida religiosa en Europa (2005). En: RELaT y en Academia.edu.
- Propuesta de paradigma pos-religional (EATWOT-VOICES 2012). En: RELaT y en Academia.edu.
- Desafíos de la ecología a las religiones (2013). En: RELaT y en Academia.edu.
- Humanizar la Humanidad. Paradigma pós-religional (Horizonte 37, 2015). En: RELaT y en Academia.edu.
- El nuevo paradigma arqueológico-bíblico (VOICES, 2015). En: RELaT y en Academia.edu.
- Errores sobre el mundo que redundan en errores sobre Dios. Los desafíos de la nueva cosmología como tareas para la teología y la espiritualidad (2015). En: RELaT y en Academia.edu.
