= Wijngaard =

Wijngaard is a surname. Notable people with the surname include:

- Frits Wijngaard (1926–2012), Dutch boxer
- Henk Wijngaard (born 1946), Dutch country singer
- Jacob Wijngaard (born 1944), Dutch mathematician, university teacher, and economist

== See also ==
- John Wijngaards (1935–2025), Dutch Catholic scripture scholar and a laicized priest
