= Luis N. Rivera-Pagán =

Puerto Rican theologian

Luis Nicolás Rivera-Pagán
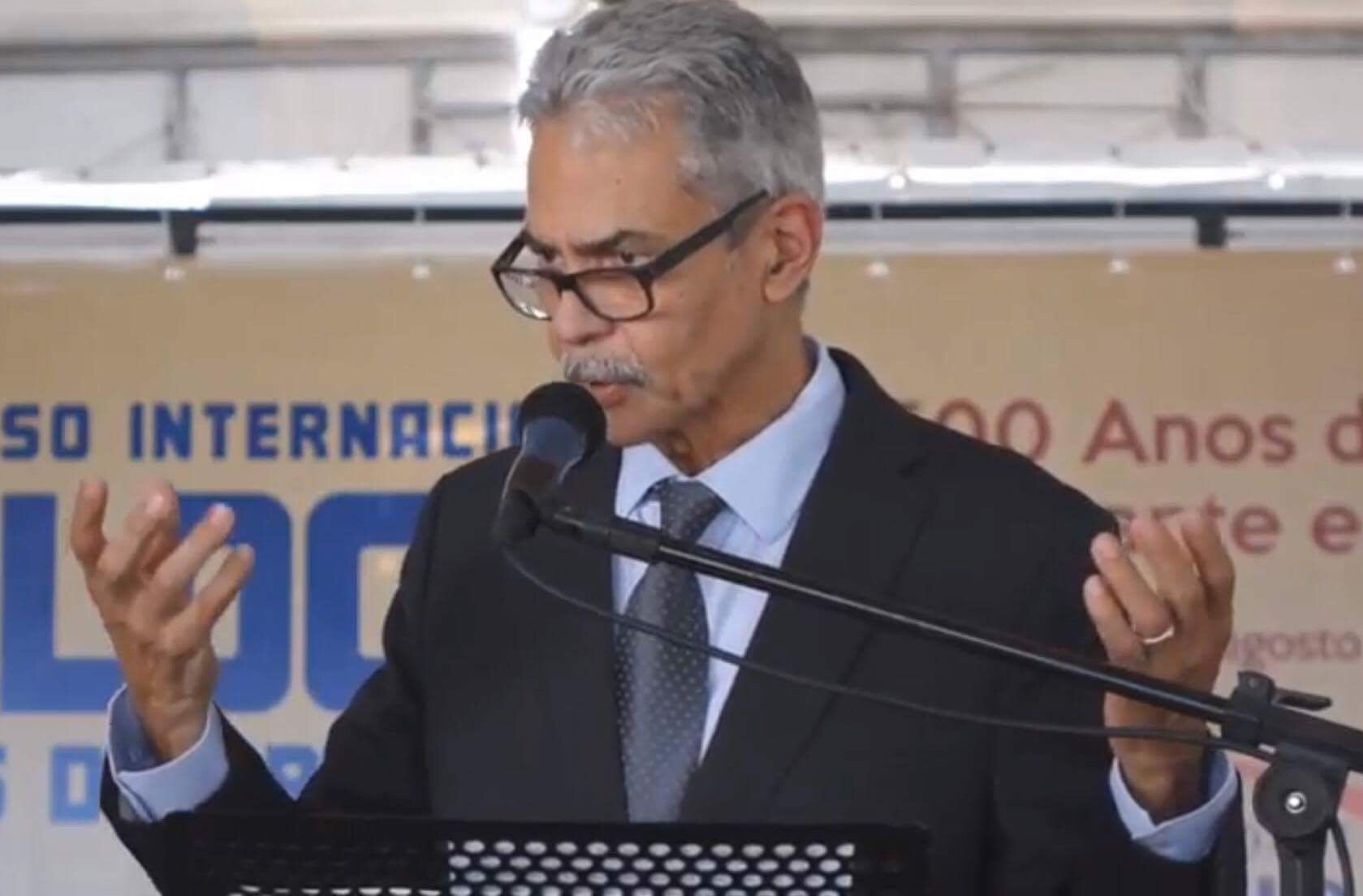
- Rivera-Pagán in 2017
- Born: December 5, 1942 (age 83); San Juan de Puerto Rico, Puerto Rico
- Citizenship: American
- Occupations: Professor-emeritus of Ecumenics and Mission
- Title: Henry Winters Luce Professor of Ecumenics and Mission Emeritus
- Spouse: Anaida Pascual

Academic background
- Education: Yale University
- Thesis: Unity and Truth: The Unity of God, Man, Jesus Christ, and the Church in Irenaeus (1970)
- Doctoral advisor: Jaroslav Pelikan

Academic work
- Discipline: Theologian

Luis Nicolás Rivera-Pagán (born December 5, 1942, in San Juan de Puerto Rico, Puerto Rico) is the Henry Winters Luce Professor Emeritus of Ecumenics at Princeton Theological Seminary.

== Biography ==
Luis Nicolás Rivera-Pagán was born in San Juan de Puerto Rico, Puerto Rico, on December 5, 1942.

Rivera-Pagán earned his M. Div. at the Evangelical Seminary of Puerto Rico in 1966, S.T.M. (1967) and M.A. (1968) at Yale University and in 1970 his PhD, also at Yale with the dissertation Unity and Truth: The Unity of God, Man, Jesus Christ, and the Church in Irenaeus, under Jaroslav Pelikan.

Between 1969 and 1970 Rivera-Pagán studied at University of Tübingen, Germany.

Between years 1970 and 2003 Rivera-Pagán was Professor of Systematic theology at the Evangelical Seminary of Puerto Rico and Professor of Humanities at the University of Puerto Rico.

Between 1999 and 2000 Rivera-Pagán was the John Alexander Mackay Visiting professor on World Christianity at Princeton Theological Seminary. This position, held during his sabbatical year lead to his appointment in 2003 to the faculty of Princeton Theological Seminary, as the Henry Winters Luce Professor of Ecumenics and Mission. In June 2007 he retired with the status of Professor-emeritus.

Presently Rivera-Pagán holds the chair of Humanities at the Faculty of General Studies of the University of Puerto Rico.

== Bibliography ==
Rivera-Pagán wrote, co-authored, edited and co-edited dozens of books, journal issues, chapters, articles, and reviews in books and journals. Below is a complete list of books, edited books and journal issues, and a selection of book chapters and journal articles.

=== Books ===
- Caminos de esperanza: Cinco sermones y un estudio bíblico. Río Piedras: Primera Iglesia Bautista de Río Piedras. 1989.
- Diálogos y polifonías: perspectivas y reseñas. Río Piedras: Seminario Evangélico de Puerto Rico. 1999.
- Entre el oro y la fe: El dilema de América. San Juan: Universidad de Puerto Rico. 1995. ISBN 0847702413.
- La esperanza de los vencidos: Hacia una visión crítica del quinto centenario. with Raúl Vidales, and Diego Irarrazaval. Guaynabo: Sonador. 1989.
- La esperanza en el presente de América Latina: Ponencias presentadas al 11 Encuentro de científicos sociales y teólogos sobre el tema Discernimiento de utopías, Costa Rica 11-16 de Julio de 1983. with Raúl Vidales (eds.). San José: Departamento Ecuménico de Investigaciones. 1983. ISBN 9977904014.
- Essays from the Diaspora. México, D.F.; Chicago: Centro Luterano de Formación Teológica; Publicaciones El Faro; Lutheran School of Theology; Centro Basilea de Investigación. 2002. ISBN 9687197552.
- La evangelización de los pueblos americanos: algunas reflexiones históricas. San Luis de Potosí: Colegio de San Luis. 1997. ISBN 9687727055.
- Evangelización y violencia: La conquista de América. San Juan: Cemí. 1992 [1990].
  - A violent evangelism: The Political and Religious Conquest of the Americas. Louisville: Westminster/John Knox. 1992. ISBN 0664253679.
- Fe y cultura en Puerto Rico. Quito: Latin American Council of Churches. 2002. ISBN 9978910468.
- God, in your Grace… Official Report of the Ninth Assembly of the World Council of Churches. Geneva: WCC Publications. 2007. ISBN 9782825415122.
- Liberación y paz: refleciones teológicas desde América Latina. with Nancy Cardoso Pereira, and Frei Betto. Guaynabo: Sonador. 1988.
- Mito, exilio y demonios: Literatura y teología en América Latina. Río Piedras: Publicaciones Puertorriqueñas. 1996. ISBN 0929441990.
- La paradoja de la razón: Filosofía y religion en Domingo Marrero Navarro. with Domingo Marrero. Guaynabo: Sonador. 1989.
- Senderos teológicos: el pensamiento evangélico puertorriqueño. Río Piedras: La Reforma. 1989. OCLC 21187827.
- A la sombra del Armagedón: reflexiones críticas sobre el desafío nuclear. Río Piedras: Edil. 1988. ISBN 9686308121.
- Los sueños del ciervo: Perspectivas teológicas desde el Caribe. Quito: Equipo de Historia y Sociología del Protestantismo en Puerto Rico; Concilio Evangélico de Puerto Rico. 1995.
- Teología y cultura en América Latina. Heredia: Universidad Nacional de Costa Rica. 2009. ISBN 9789977958279.

=== Selected book chapters and journal articles ===
- "Aportes del Marxismo". Pueblo oprimido, señor de la historia. Montevideo: Tierra Nueva. 1972. pp. 249–253.
- Meléndez, Guillermo, ed. (1992). "Bartolomé de Las Casas y la esclavitud africana". Sentido Histórico del V Centenario (1492-1992): 16th Simposio de CEHILA (1989: Santo Domingo, Dominican Republic). San José, Costa Rica: DEI. pp. 63–84. ISBN 9977830606.
- "Dilema y desafios culturales de las comunidades negras en el Caribe: Ritmos sagrados de los pueblos afroantillanos en Alejo Carpentier". Los rostros de Dios: ensayos sobre cultura y religión afrocaribeña. Quito: CLAI. 1998. pp. 11–43.
- "Entre el terror y la esperanza: Apuntes sobre la religion, la guerra y la paz". Conferencia Magistral 2003-2004. Puerto Rico: Cátedra UNESCO de Educación para la Paz, Facultad de Educación, Universidad de Puerto Rico. 2005. pp. 70–79.
- Rodríguez-Díaz, Daniel R.; Cortes-Fuentes, David, eds. (1994). "Formation of a Hispanic Theology: The Capitulation of Burgos". Hidden Stories: Unveiling the History of the Latino Church. Decatur: Asociación para la Educación Teológica Hispana. pp. 67–97.
- Valentín, Benjamín, ed. (2010). "God the Liberator: Theology, History, and Politics". In Our Voices: Latino/a Renditions of Theology. Maryknoll: Orbis. pp. 1–20. ISBN 9781570758904.
- "Myth, Utopia, and Faith: Theology and Culture in Latin America". Princeton Seminary Bulletin. 21 (new) (2). Princeton: Princeton Theological Seminary: 142–160. 2000. ISSN 0032-8413. Archived from the original on June 10, 2010. John Alexander Makay Visiting professor in World Christianity lecture at Princeton Theological Seminary.
- "A Prophetic Challenge to the Church: The Last Word of Bartolomé de las Casas". Princeton Seminary Bulletin. 24 (new) (2). Princeton: Princeton Theological Seminary: 216–240. 2003. ISSN 0032-8413. Archived from the original on June 10, 2010. Inaugural address at Princeton Theological Seminary.
- "Theology and Literature in Latin America: John A. Mackay and the Other Spanish Christ" (PDF). Journal of Hispanic/Latino Theology. 7 (4). Collegeville: Liturgical Press: 7–25. 2000. ISSN 1077-7989.
- "Teología y praxis de liberación". Pueblo oprimido, señor de la historia. Montevideo: Tierra Nueva. 1972. pp. 173–176.
- Dow, Kirkpatrick, ed. (1988). "Toward a Theology of Peace: Critical Notes on the Biblical Hermeneutic of Latin American Liberation Theology". Faith Born in the Struggle for Life: A Rereading of Protestant Faith in Latin America Today. Lewistine McCoy (trans.). Grand Rapids: Eerdmans. pp. 52–75. ISBN 0802803555.
- Pixley, Jorge, ed. (1988). "La utopía bíblica de la paz: anotaciones críticas a la hermenéutica latinoamericana". Hacia una fe evangélica latinoamericanista. San José de Costa Rica: DEI. pp. 183–200. ISBN 9977904596.
- Chase, Kenneth; Jacobs, Alan, eds. (2003). "Violence of the Conquistadores and Prophetic Indignation". Must Christianity Be Violent? Reflections on History, Practice, and Theology. Grand Rapids: Brazos. pp. 37–49. ISBN 1587430649.
- Brown, Sally A.; Miller, Patrick D., eds. (2005). "Woes of Captive Women: From Lament to Defiance in Times of War". Lament: Reclaiming Practices in Pulpit, Pew, and Public Square. Louisville: Westminster/John Knox. pp. 121–134. ISBN 0664227503.
- Bolioli, Oscar, ed. (1998). "The Word Became Flesh: Incarnation, Gospel, and Culture in Latin America". Hope and Justice for All in the Americas: Discerning God's Mission. New York: Friendship. pp. 52–69. ISBN 0377003255.
