= Pontifical University of Salamanca =

Catholic university in Salamanca, Spain

- Universidad Pontificia de Salamanca
- Seal of the Pontifical University of Salamanca
- Type: Private
- Established: 1940
- Affiliations: Catholic
- Students: 6520
- Location: Salamanca, Castile and León, Spain; 40.963°N 5.667°W
- Website: www.upsa.es

The Pontifical University of Salamanca (in Spanish: Universidad Pontificia de Salamanca) is a private Roman Catholic university based in Salamanca, Spain.

== History ==
This Pontifical University has its origins in the University of Salamanca, founded in 1218 and one of the oldest institutions of Europe and the whole world. Resulting from the resolution of the Spanish kingdom of dissolving the faculties of Theology and Canon Law at the University of Salamanca in 1854, Pope Pius XII decided to establish a new pontifical university and restore those faculties in a new institution. Additional faculties and schools were added over the years.

Five years after its creation as a Pontifical University, the Faculty of Philosophy was established. In 1949 the studies of Trilingual Biblical Philology were introduced and in 1958 those of Educational Sciences. This was followed in 1971 by the Faculty of Psychology and Political Science and Sociology, Nursing in 1980, Physiotherapy in 1986, Information Sciences in 1988, Computer Science in 1990, and the Faculty of Insurance, Legal and Business Sciences in 1992.

Olegario González de Cardedal, who received the Ratzinger Prize in 2011, teaches Dogmatic and Fundamental Theology.

== Degrees ==
Currently, the Pontifical University of Salamanca offers the following undergraduate degrees adapted to the European Higher Education Area :

=== Salamanca Campus ===
- Canon Law
- Business Administration
- Law
- International Relations
- Sciences of Physical Activity and Sport
- Communication Studies
- Social Education
- Nursing
- Philosophy
- Trilingual Biblical Philology
- Humanities
- Computer Science and Engineering
- Speech Therapy
- Master in Early Childhood Education
- Teacher of Primary Education
- Pedagogy
- Journalism
- Psychology
- Advertising and Public Relations

=== Madrid Campus ===
- Architecture
- Building Engineering
- Computer Science and Engineering
- Industrial Management Engineering
- Nursing
- Osteopathy
- Physiotherapy
- Sociology

== Notable alumni ==
- José María Vigil (born 1946), theologian

== See also ==
- List of Jesuit sites
- List of modern universities in Europe (1801–1945)
