= Carlos Cardoza-Orlandi =

Puerto Rican academic (born 1961)

Carlos F. Cardoza-Orlandi
- Occupations: Theologian, historian, academic and author
- Awards: 2014 Orlando E. Costas Preaching Award, Palmer Theological Seminary; Book Award for Excellence in Missiology, American Society of Missiology; Building Bridges Award, Islamic Speaker’s Bureau of Atlanta

Academic background
- Education: B.A., General Studies (University of Puerto Rico); M.Div. (Evangelical Seminary of Puerto Rico); Th.M., Mission, Ecumenics and History of Religions (Princeton Theological Seminary); Ph.D, Mission, Ecumenics, and History of Religions (Princeton Theological Seminary)

Carlos F. Cardoza-Orlandi (born April 21, 1961) is a Puerto Rican theologian, historian, teacher, academic and author. He holds the Frederick E. Roach Chair in World Christianity at Baylor University.

Cardoza-Orlandi’s research focuses on the socio-cultural interplay between Christians and people of other faiths, the historical and current interpretations of the movement of the Christian religion at both the institutional and popular levels, and the theoretical and theological constructions of the current interplay between cultures and religions in Africa, Asia and Latin America. He co-authored (with Justo Gonzalez) To All Nations from All Nations: A History of the Christian Missionary Movement, a for Excellence in Missiology by the American Society of Missiology in 2013.

He served as the regional editor for Latin America of the Journal of the Tao Fong Shan Christian Centre and contributing editor for Journal of the Latino Theology.

== Education ==
Cardoza-Orlandi obtained his Bachelor’s degree in General Studies from the University of Puerto Rico in 1984. He then enrolled at the Evangelical Seminary of Puerto Rico and earned a Master of Divinity degree in 1987. He received a second Master’s degree in Mission, Ecumenics and History of Religions in 1990, and completed his Ph.D. in Mission, Ecumenics and History of Religions with concentration in Latin America and the Caribbean in 1999 from Princeton Theological Seminary. In 2007, he was awarded with a certificate in Leadership by Cox Business School, Southern Methodist University.

== Career ==
Cardoza-Orlandi held an appointment as Professor of World Christianity at Columbia Theological Seminary in 1994, before joining Perkins School of Theology, SMU in 2010 as Professor of World Christianities and Mission Studies. He left Perkins School of Theology in 2018 and became the Frederick E. Roach Professor of Religion, World Christianity at Baylor University.

Cardoza-Orlandi is also active in Christian grass-roots communities. He has been an Ordained Minister of the Christian Church in Puerto Rico since 1988 and continues to work with Christian communities as a theological educator.

== Research ==
Cardoza-Orlandi’s research is mainly focused on the socio-cultural interplay between Christians and people of other faiths, particularly those who practice Afro-Caribbean, Amerindian, Spiritist religions, and Islam, the historical and current interpretations of the movement of the Christian religion at both the institutional and popular levels, and the theoretical and theological constructions of the current interplay between cultures and religions in Africa, Asia and Latin America, including immigrants and transnational movements.

=== Caribbean, Latin American, and Hispanic/Latinoax Christianity ===
In his work, Cardoza-Orlandi has described Latino Christianity as consequent of violent encounters, syncretistic religious practices, and the crossings of different cultures, and should be regarded as a very important segment in the history of Christianity for the Western hemisphere. He has discussed the significance of Hispanic/Latino Christianity, and drawn attention to the misconceptions that frequently occur in understanding Hispanic Theology and Latin American Theology.

Cardoza-Orlandi also explores the relationship between Afro-Caribbean, Amerindian, and Charismatic and Pentecostal Christianity. Utilizing a comparative approach from African Christian studies, he investigates the dynamics between these primal religious expressions in Latin America and the Caribbean and identifies the synergy between these traditions.

=== Christian Missionary Movement ===
In his book published in 2013, Cardoza-Orlandi highlighted missionary practices, and focused mainly on the cross-cultural, cross-religious, and cross-confessional dynamics that were involved in Christian missionary activity. He also described the origin of missionary activities from national rather than international missionaries. He concluded his book with a discussion on postmodern and postcolonial world.

=== History, Christian Mission, and Justice ===
Based on the work by Steven Bevans and Robert Schroeder on Prophetic Dialogue, Cardoza-Orlandi has focused on the role of Prophetic Dialogue as a way to witness and participate in God's mercy by freeing oneself from systems of oppression and evil. He defined prophetic dialogue in terms of a paradox that offers untraveled roads. In his book entitled Una Introducción A La Mission, he explored the limitations of mission in the context of the United States and also discussed the beginning and spread of mission practices in broader community.

In another book, Cardoza-Orlandi described the ambiguous nature of the term 'mission' in the context of North American Christians, and highlighted the works of Emil Brunner to support the idea that to be the church is to be in mission. In his research work, he also defined Christian missional engagement as a theological matrix integrating memory, experience, and expectation as ways to approach Christian history rather than the modern categories of past, present, and future in context of Christian history.

== Awards and honors ==
- 1987 - Angel Archilla Cabrera Homiletics Award, Evangelical Seminary of Puerto Rico
- 2007 - Building Bridges Award, Islamic Speaker’s Bureau of Atlanta
- 2010-2011 - The Outreach Academic Award, Perkins School of Theology, Southern Methodist University
- 2013 - Book Award for Excellence in Missiology, American Society of Missiology
- 2014 - The 2014 Orlando E. Costas Preaching Award, Palmer Theological Seminary

== Bibliography ==
=== Books ===
- Mission: An Essential Guide (2002) ISBN 9781426763281
- Una Introducción a la Misión AETH: An Introduction to Missions Spanish (2003) ISBN 9780687074174
- To All Nations From All Nations: A History of the Christian Missionary Movement (2013) ISBN 9781426754890

=== Selected articles ===
- Cardoza Orlandi, Carlos F. (1998). ""Now You See It, Now You Don't": Mission and Ecumenism in a Hispanic/Latino Perspective". Theology Today.
- Cardoza Orlandi, Carlos F. (2013). "Prophetic Dialogue: A Historical Perspective Bending Time in History to Rediscover the Gospel". Missiology: An International Review. 41 (1): 22–34. doi:10.1177/0091829612464745.
- Cardoza Orlandi, Carlos F. (2019). "Forum: Quilting as metaphor for theological education". Teaching THEOLOGY & RELIGION.
- Cardoza Orlandi, Carlos F. (2019). "Segundo Domingo después de Pentecostés". Working Preacher.
- Cardoza Orlandi, Carlos F. (2019). "Tercer domingo después de Pentecostés La otra cara de la misión profética: la inclusión y la misericordia". Working Preacher.
- Cardoza Orlandi, Carlos F. (2025). "Jesus in the World of the Spirits: Caribbean Evangélico Christianity and Afro-Caribbean Religions (Lukumí and Espiritismo Caribeño)". Studies in World Christianity. 31 (2): 120–139. doi:10.3366/swc.2025.0506.
