= Wijngaards Institute for Catholic Research =

British progressive think tank

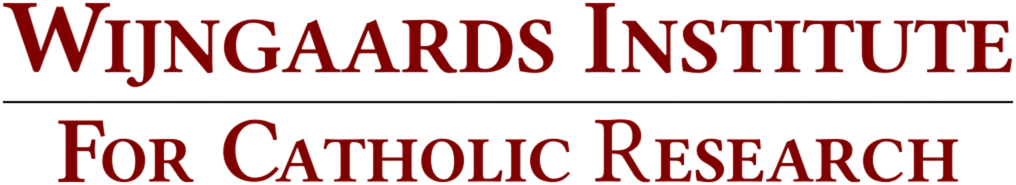
- Motto: For a just Church
- Founder: John Wijngaards
- Established: 1983
- Website: wijngaardsinstitute.com

The Wijngaards Institute for Catholic Research ("Wijngaards Institute") is a British progressive think tank that produces research on debated issues within contemporary Roman Catholic theology. It does so by coordinating an international network of academics, most of whom are Roman Catholic.

== Early beginnings ==
The institute was established by Dr John Wijngaards in 1983 as Housetop Centre for Adult Faith Formation ("Housetop"). Initially, it focused on producing resources for spirituality in the modern age.

Nationwide research in the UK produced material for a video course on the practice of meditation: "The Seven Circles of Prayer" (1987), winner of the award for "Creative Excellence" at the 1987 Video Festival in Elmhurst, Illinois, USA.

It was followed by two other video courses: "Peace in your Home" (1988) on ways of fostering prayer in the family, and "Loaves of Thanksgiving" (1989) on re-vitalising the celebration of the weekly Eucharist.

The "Walking on Water" video courses for training community leaders were produced between 1990-1992 and have been translated into 14 languages. They comprised three textbooks and nine 30-minute stories on accompanying videos. The stories were filmed in Brazil, Colombia, Indonesia, Kenya and the UK. Several of those videos won awards.

In 1995 Housetop published "How To Make Sense of God". The course book received a prize from the Catholic Press Association (USA) for "best adult reading". The accompanying video film "Journey to the Centre of Love" comprises 5 episodes of approximately 45 minutes each, which are freely available online. It won the Grand Prix at the Catholic International Film Festival at Warsaw in 1995 and the Columbus Award (the main award) at the International Film Fair of Columbus, Ohio, in 1996.

Housetop's latest video course focused on Christian marriage. "For Better, For Worse" was produced in 2000 with academic advice from the International Academy for Marital Spirituality (INTAMS). It was broadcast on the Belgian Catholic television network KTRC in autumn 2000 under the title "Tussen Man & Vrouw" ("Between Husband & Wife"). It is being distributed in the UK and Ireland by Veritas Publications.

== Catherine of Siena Virtual College ==
In 2007 Housetop founded the Catherine of Siena Virtual College ("CSVC"), which offered affordable university-level online courses on leadership and the role of women in society. Under its direction more than 1,100 students enrolled, mostly women (90%), and from developing countries. Such a rapid growth has meant that it became difficult for the institute to provide an adequate infra-structure to do justice to its potential. For this reason, in September 2014 Housetop, which by then had been renamed the Wijngaards Institute for Catholic Research, agreed to hand over ownership of CSVC to the University of Roehampton, which has renamed it the "Catherine of Siena College".

== Focus on Church reform ==
Pope John-Paul II's Ordinatio sacerdotalis in 1994 which ruled out the ordination of women in the Catholic Church forced the question of women's equality within the Roman Catholic Church to the front. It was decided that the Institute would focus its research on the ordination of women and publish a website to present the academic evidence for and against: "Women Can Be Priests". The website has grown out to be the largest internet resource on women and holy orders, with extensive documentation in 25 languages.

Subsequent research led to several declarations, statements, and reports being produced:

- The "Catholic Scholars' Declaration on Authority in the Church", calling for democratization of church structures in line with Vatican Council II. It was published on 11 October 2012. Signed by 216 academics from 139 universities around the world, it was officially launched in the British Houses of Parliament on 5 March 2013.
- The "Catholic Scholars' Statement on Marriage and the Family", submitted in preparation for the Synods of Bishops of 2014 and 2015.
- The "Documented Appeal to Pope Francis to Request the Reinstatement of the Ordained Diaconate for Women", sent to the Vatican on 3 September 2013.
- The "Catholic Scholars' Statement on the Ethics of Using Contraceptives", based on an interdisciplinary study by 23 international academics. The Statement was co-signed by more than 150 Catholic scholars and launched at an event at the United Nations in New York on 20 September 2016. It recommends that "the Catholic 'magisterium' seek the opinion of Christian theologians and experts in other relevant disciplines with regard to the ethics of using modern non-abortifacient contraceptives for the purposes of family planning", with a view to repealing the prohibition to use so-called "artificial" contraceptives upheld by Pope Paul VI in his encyclical Humanae Vitae of 1968.

The online dissemination of the Statement before its official launch provoked the launch of a counter-statement at the Catholic University of America in Washington, titled "Affirmation of the Church’s Teaching on the Gift of Sexuality".
