= Agustina Luvis Núñez =

Puerto Rican theologian

- Born: March 31, 1959 (age 67); Loíza, Puerto Rico

Academic background
- Education: University of Puerto Rico (BS); Evangelical Seminary of Puerto Rico (MDiv); Lutheran School of Theology at Chicago (Ph.D.)
- Doctoral advisor: José David Rodriguez

Academic work
- Discipline: Theology
- Institutions: Evangelical Seminary of Puerto Rico

Agustina Luvis Núñez (born March 31, 1959) is a Puerto Rican theologian, teacher and writer. She holds the position of academic dean at the Evangelical Seminary of Puerto Rico where she heads the Doctor of Ministry program. She is recognized as having actively contributed to the field of Latina feminist theology, an unusual achievement for a Black Puerto Rican woman. Her book Creada a su imagen: Una pastoral integral para la mujer (Created in His Image: An Integral Pastoral Approach for Women) calls for a pastoral ministry to serve the needs of women.

== Early life and education ==
Born in Loíza, Puerto Rico on March 31, 1959, Agustina Luvis Núñez was the daughter of Mario Luvis Grey and his wife Luz Belia Núñez González. She was brought up by poor but caring parents who ensured her education and that of her sister. From an early age, she attended the local Pentecostal church, Iglesia Defensores de la Febecame, which led to her later interest in theology.

After schooling in the Black communities of Loíza and Canóvanas, Luvis studied biology at the University of Puerto Rico, graduating in 1980. At the same university, she continued her studies in the University of Puerto Rico, Medical Sciences Campus, graduating as a medical technologist in 1982. It was not until some 20 years later that she began studying religion at the Evangelical Seminary of Puerto Rico (Seminario Evangélico de Puerto Rico), earning a Master of Divinity degree in 2001. She then moved to Chicago to study at the Lutheran School of Theology where after a Master in Theology in 2003, she earned a Ph.D. in systematic theology in 2009. Her dissertation was titled Sewing a New Cloth: A Proposal for a Pentecostal Ecclesiology Fashioned as a Community Gifted by the Spirit with the Marks of the Church from a Latina Perspective. José David Rodriguez was her doctoral advisor.

== Career ==
On graduating as a medical technologist in 1980, Luvis was active for some twenty years in Puerto Rico's healthcare sector, working in a medical laboratory in order to support herself and her family. During this period, she also served as a Pentecostal Sunday school teacher. Her interest in pursuing religious studies was triggered by a friend who told her she had a call from God. As a result, she began taking classes at the Evangelical Seminary.

When she became interested in studying at the Lutheran School in Chicago, despite being granted a scholarship for study, Luvis was worried she would not be able to afford the cost of living in the city. Her manager and friends at the laboratory told her not to worry. They would cover her costs.

Her first experience in working as a teacher began in 2003 when as a second year doctoral student, she was invited by the Evangelical Seminary of Puerto Rico to teach a summer course on feminist theologies. This was followed in the summer of 2004 by a course on Pentecostalism.

Thanks to the success of these courses, she was invited to teach full time at the Seminary in 2005. It was recommended in this connection that she should seek ordination. Despite her explanations that she was not interested in heading a local congregation, she was nevertheless ordained. She concluded with satisfaction that teaching in the seminary and beyond was recognized as a valid reason for ordination. From 2005 to 2009 she was therefore able to teach at the Seminary while preparing her doctorate.

After her doctorate, in 2010 Luvis received the title of assistant professor of theology at the Seminary, a post still holds (as February 2021). Her courses cover topics related to Caribbean history, including relationships between colonialism and Christianity and Christian violence against women. She emphasizes the need for social justice, especially in regard to gender, race and inequality.

She has also continued her involvement in the healthcare sector, monitoring laboratory work in the east of Puerto Rico.

== Publications ==
Luvis Núñez's doctoral thesis Sewing a New Cloth: A Proposal for a Pentecostal Ecclesiology Fashioned as a Community Gifted by the Spirit with the Marks of the Church from a Latina Perspective (2009) presents a feminist approach to Puerto Rican Pentecostalism, criticizing the lack of attention Euro-American theologians have paid to Afro-Caribbean culture. It concludes with a proposal for creating a Pentecostal approach specifically addressing Caribbean Hispanic women.

Published in 2012, Creada a su imagen: Una pastoral integral para la mujer (Created in His Image: An Integral Pastoral Approach for Women) calls for a pastoral ministry which caters specifically for women. After presenting the important roles women play in the Bible and in particular the way in which Jesus treats women, Luvis Núñez suggests the church should build on this model to affirm the dignity and equality of women. The liturgy should, for example, include prayers calling for the healing of women who have been sexually abused. In this connection, she proposes an "International Day for the Elimination of Violence against Women".

Luvis Núñez has also contributed a chapter titled "La crisis, momento oportuno para afirmar las marcas de la iglesia" (The crisis, a good time to affirm the attributes of the Church) to Otros Caminos: Propuestas para la crisis en Puerto Rico (2012). Here she suggests that the economic crisis in Puerto Rico provides an opportunity for the Church to explore its true identity in more robust terms. Her contribution in 2015 to El sexo en la Iglesia titled "Liberación: Reflexiones teológicas sobre el abuso sexual y nuestro rol como Iglesia" (Liberation: Theological reflections on sexual abuse and our role as the Church) again enlarges on the subject of sexual violence, so prevalent in Puerto Rico. Dismissing myths about forgiveness, she believes it is the Church's duty to address the issue.
