= Clodovis Boff =

Brazilian theologian

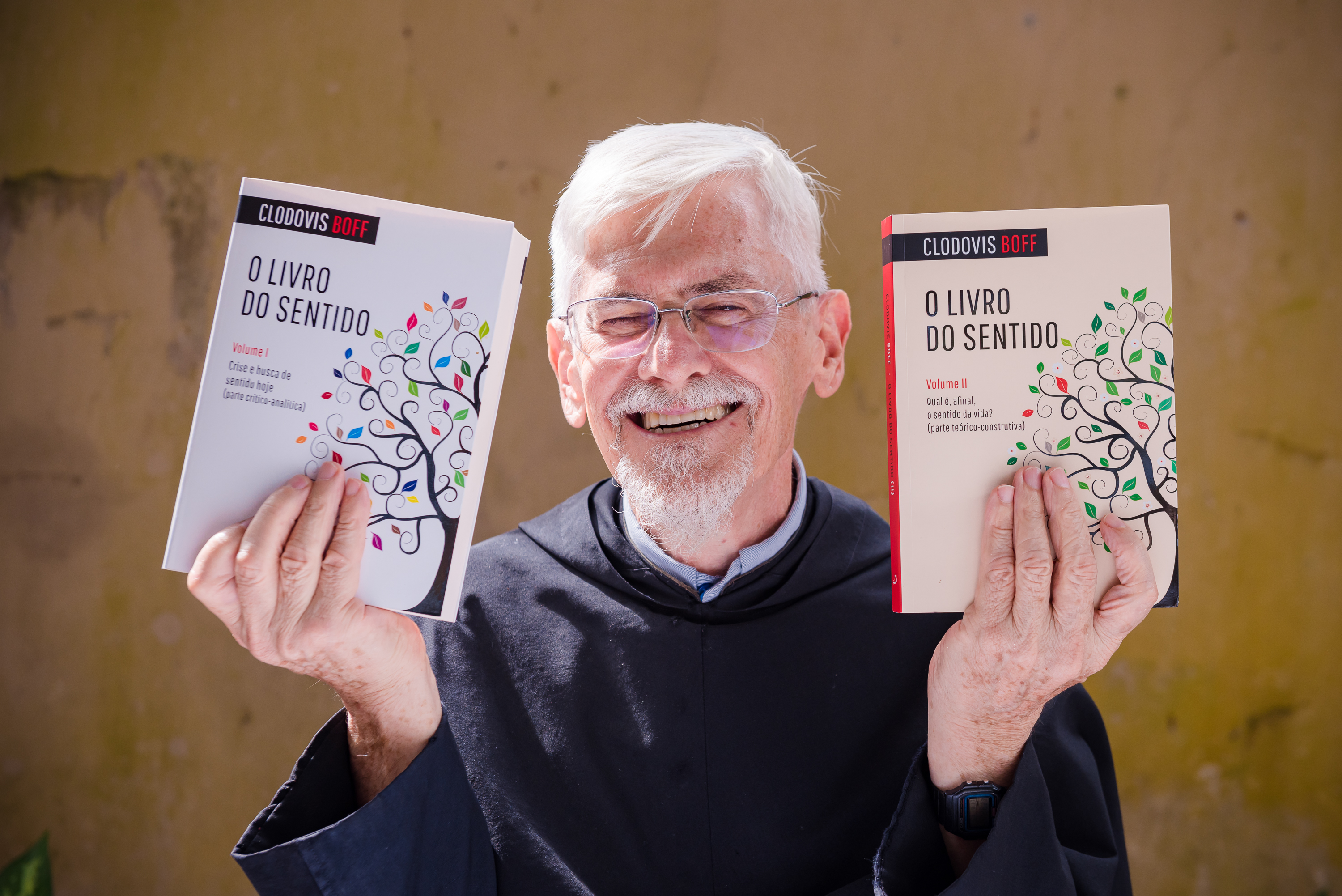
Clodovis Boff

Clodovis Boff, OSM (Portuguese: [ˈklɔdɔviz ˈbɔf]; born 1944) is a Brazilian Catholic priest, theologian, philosopher, writer and professor. He is a member of the Servites.

== Biography ==
Clodovis Boff is grandson of Italian immigrants who arrived from Veneto region to Rio Grande do Sul in the late nineteenth century. He did his primary and secondary studies in Concordia, Rio Negro and Agudos. Boff studied philosophy in Mogi das Cruzes and obtained a doctorate in theology at the Catholic University of Leuven, Belgium.

Boff became a member of the Servite Order and was initially an adherent of liberation theology. Unlike his brother Leonardo, he was not processed by the Congregation for the Doctrine of the Faith, although in the 1980s he lost his chair at the Pontifical Catholic University of Rio de Janeiro, in addition to being restricted from the theological faculty of his Order in Rome.

As early as 1986 Clodovis Boff declared that the acquisition of Marxist categories have performed in the early stages of liberation theology an attitude of carelessness and exaggeration. He came to full agreement with the Latin-American bishops who gathered in Aparecida in 2007.

Boff lives in Curitiba and is a professor at the Pontifical Catholic University of Paraná.

== Works ==
- Theology and practice - The epistemological foundations of liberation theology. Kaiser Verlag, Munich 1983, ISBN 3-459-01505-5.
- The liberation of the poor: reflections on the basic concern of Latin American liberation theology, Ed. Exodus, 1986, ISBN 3-905-57518-3.
- Leonardo Boff: How to drives theology of liberation? Patmos Verlag, Düsseldorf, 1986, ISBN 3-491-77653-8.
- Rottländer Peter (ed.): Liberation theology and Marxism, Liberation Edition, 1986, ISBN 3-923-79221-2.
- Norbert Greinacher (ed.): Reversal and a new beginning: the North-South conflict as a challenge to theology and the church in Europe, Ed. Exodus, 1986, ISBN 3-905-57515-9.
- Jorge Pixley: The Bible, the Church, and the Poor (The Option for the Poor); Maryknoll, N.Y.: Orbis Books, 1989, ISBN 0883446146.
- Feet-on-the-Ground Theology - A Brazilian Journey. WIPF and STOCK Publishers, 2008, ISBN 978-1-60608-011-5.
- Fr. Leandro Rasera Adorno (org.): The Catholic Church Crisis and Liberation Theology (Portuguese: A Crise da Igreja Católica e a Teologia da Libertação), Ecclesiae, 2023, ISBN 978-8-58491-168-4.
