= Leonardo Boff =

Brazilian Catholic theologian, philosopher, and former priest

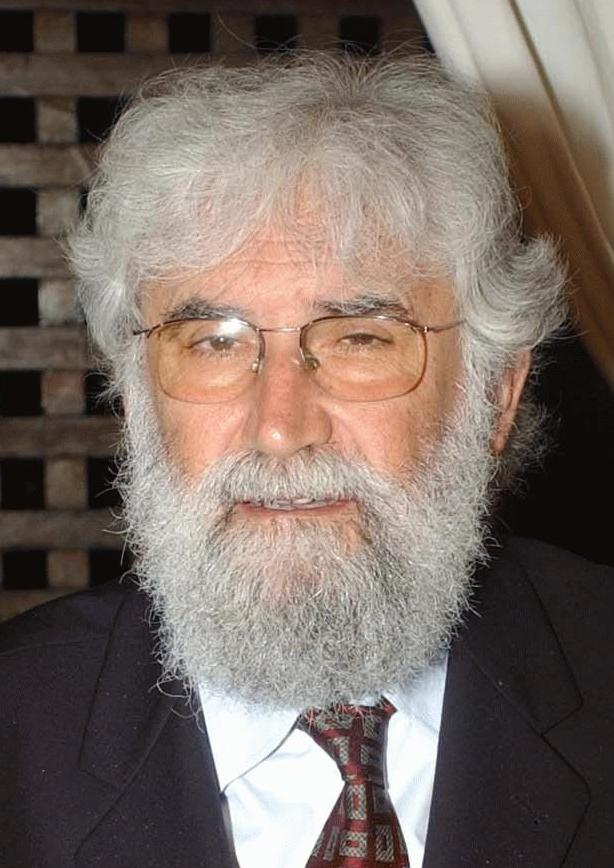
- Boff in 2003
- Born: Genézio Darci Boff; 14 December 1938 (age 87); Concórdia, Santa Catarina, Brazil
- Occupations: Theologian; writer; philosopher
- Spouse: Márcia Monteiro da Silva Miranda
- Relatives: Clodovis Boff (brother)
- Awards: Right Livelihood Award (in 2000)

Leonardo Boff (Brazilian Portuguese: [leoˈnaʁdu ˈbɔf]; born Genézio Darci Boff, pronounced [ʒeˈnɛzju daʁˈsi ˈbɔf]; 14 December 1938) is a Brazilian Catholic theologian, philosopher, writer, and former Catholic priest known for his active support for Latin American liberation theology. He is professor emeritus of ethics, philosophy of religion, and ecology at the Rio de Janeiro State University. In 2001, he received the Right Livelihood Award for "his inspiring insights and practical work to help people realise the links between human spirituality, social justice and environmental stewardship".

== Studies ==
Genézio Darci Boff was born in 1938 in Concórdia, Santa Catarina, Brazil. He entered the Franciscan Order in 1959 and was ordained a Catholic priest in 1964. He spent the following years studying for a doctorate in theology and philosophy at LMU Munich, which he received in 1970. Boff's doctoral thesis studied in what measure the Church can be a sign of the sacred and the divine in the secular world and in the process of liberation of the oppressed. His thesis was published in German in 1972 as Die Kirche als Sakrament im Horizont der Welterfahrung. His brother is the theologian Clodovis Boff.

== Liberation theology ==
Boff is one of the best-known supporters (along with Gustavo Gutiérrez, Juan Luis Segundo, and Jon Sobrino) of early liberation theology. He was present in the first reflections that sought to articulate indignation against poverty and marginalisation with a promissory discourse on faith, leading to Latin American liberation theology. He continues to be a controversial figure in the Catholic Church, primarily for his sharp criticism of the church's hierarchy, which he sees as "fundamentalist", but also for his political positions.

== Political views ==
Boff is critical of secular power, as well as United States foreign policy. He opposed the Iraq War and considered George W. Bush and Ariel Sharon's leadership to be similar to that of "fundamentalist terrorist states". He also criticizes despotic rulers in the Middle East, saying: "Those [emirs and kings] are despotic, they do not even have a constitution. Though extremely rich, they maintain the people in poverty." Boff has voiced his support for the Campaign for the Establishment of a United Nations Parliamentary Assembly, an organisation which advocates for democratic reform in the United Nations, and the creation of a more accountable international political system.

== Laicization ==
The Magisterium of the Catholic Church does not consider Boff's views of the Church's leadership acceptable. They also see his support of liberation theology as having "politicized everything" and reproached his proximity to Marxism. In 1985, the Congregation for the Doctrine of the Faith, directed at that time by Cardinal Joseph Ratzinger (later Pope Benedict XVI), silenced him for a year for his book Church: Charism and Power. He later accused Ratzinger of "religious terrorism".

Boff was almost silenced again in 1992 by the Church, this time to prevent him from participating in the Eco-92 Earth Summit in Rio de Janeiro, which finally led him to leave the Franciscan religious order and the priesthood. Boff joined an international group of Catholic scholars who in 2012 issued the Jubilee Declaration on reform of authority in the Catholic Church. For most of his life, Boff has worked as a professor in the academic fields of theology, ethics, and philosophy throughout Brazil and also as lecturer in many universities abroad such as the University of Lisbon, the University of Barcelona, the University of Lund, the University of Oslo, and the University of Torino. Boff commented on the election of Pope Francis in March 2013: "I am encouraged by this choice, viewing it as a pledge for a church of simplicity and of ecological ideals." He said the new pope was conservative in many respects but had liberal views on some subjects as well.

== Works ==
- The Tao of Liberation: Exploring the Ecology of Transformation, together with Mark Hathaway. 2009, Orbis Books. ISBN 978-15-7075-841-6
- Evangelio del Cristo cósmico. 2009. ISBN 978-84-9879-087-0
- El águila y la gallina. Una metáfora de la condición humana. Cuarta edición 2006. ISBN 978-84-8164-514-9
- Ecología: grito de la Tierra, grito de los pobres. Cuarta edición 2006. ISBN 978-84-8164-104-2
- Femenino y masculino. Una nueva conciencia para el encuentro de las diferencias. 2004. ISBN 978-84-8164-689-4
- La voz del arco iris. 2003. ISBN 978-84-8164-589-7
- El cuidado esencial. Ética de lo humano, compasión por la Tierra. 2002. ISBN 978-84-8164-517-0
- Fundamentalismo. La globalización y el futuro de la humanidad. 2003. ISBN 84-293-1476-8
- Mística y espiritualidad, junto a Frei Betto. Tercera edición 2002. ISBN 978-84-8164-102-8
- Ética planetaria desde el Gran Sur. 2001. ISBN 978-84-8164-412-8
- Gracia y experiencia humana. 2001. ISBN 978-84-8164-498-2
- El despertar del águila. 2000. ISBN 978-84-8164-409-8
- La dignidad de la Tierra. Ecología, mundialización, espiritualidad. 2000. ISBN 978-84-8164-363-3
- La opción-Tierra: la solución para la tierra no cae del cielo. 2008. ISBN 978-84-293-1762-6
- Ecclesiogenesis: The Base Communities Reinvent the Church. 1986. ISBN 978-08-8344-214-2
- Church: Charism and Power. 1985. ISBN 0-8245-0590-5
- Los sacramentos de la vida. 1977. ISBN 978-84-293-0491-6
