= Catholic Scholars' Declaration on Authority in the Church =

In 2012, more than 200 theologians from the Catholic Church made a declaration titled Catholic Scholars' Declaration on Authority in the Church with proposals for changes in church governance. They demanded a redefining of papal authority with more latitude for bishops in Synods and Bishops' Conferences, and more power to selected groups of clergy and privileged laity in diocesan and parochial councils.

== Demands ==
The Declaration is made up of seven demands:

1. The role of the papacy should be redefined in line with the Vatican II Council so as not to hamper the exercise of authority by others in the Church. These ‘other’ authorities are spelled out under the next six headings.
2. Bishops should be given more autonomy, both as pastors of their dioceses and members of national episcopal conferences.
3. The Central Synod of Bishops should take part in deciding overall church policy, with and next to the Pope.
4. The laity should actively participate in church governance through pastoral councils on all levels.
5. Bishops and other church leaders should, to the extent possible, be elected more locally and democratically. The Vatican Council recommended democracy in politics. By implication, it is claimed, this applies also to selecting bishops. Moreover, the election of bishops used to be more local and democratic.
6. The Roman Curia needs to be reformed.
7. The Congregation for the Doctrine of the Faith needs to be given independent, professional advisers. The implication is that it will then protect the freedom of academic research and expression, rather than suppress it.

The Declaration has been published in eight languages, with a fuller explanation of each of the seven demands in further documentation. It ends with the appeal: "The exercise of authority in our church should emulate the standards of openness, accountability and democracy achieved in modern society. Leadership should be seen to be honest and credible; inspired by humility and service; breathing concern for people rather than preoccupation with rules and discipline."

== Origin and launch ==
The idea was born when a group of reform-minded Catholic theologians met at an international conference on 'Handing On the Torch' (Utrecht, 2010). They concluded that in many areas of the Church's life progress is blocked by an imbalance in the exercise of authority. Theologian and writer John Wijngaards spearheaded the effort to gather more information and documentation. Wijngaards, a priest who resigned from his ministry in 1998 and subsequently married, is primarily known for his advocacy of women's ordination and for founding the Wijngaards Institute for Catholic Research.

The Declaration was opened for endorsement on 11 October 2012 on the occasion of the 50th anniversary of the opening of the Second Vatican Council. That is why it was originally known as the ‘Jubilee Declaration’.

On 5 March 2013, the Catholic Scholars' Declaration was publicly launched for England by an endorsement ceremony in the Houses of Parliament, London. Baroness Helena Kennedy explained her reasons for becoming sponsor of the declaration.
