= John Wijngaards =

Catholic theologian (1935–2025)

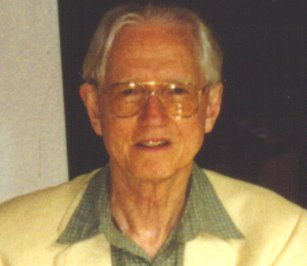
- Born: Johannes Nicolaas Maria Wijngaards; 30 September 1935; Soerajabaya, Dutch East Indies
- Died: 2 January 2025 (aged 89)
- Occupation: Priesthood
- Years active: 1959–2025
- Known for: Espousing gender equality among Priests
- Notable work: Karunamayudu, a 1978 Telugu language biopic on the life of Jesus Christ

Johannes Nicolaas Maria Wijngaards (30 September 1935 – 2 January 2025) was a Dutch Catholic scripture scholar and a former priest.

From 1977 he was prominent in his public opposition to the teaching of the Catholic Church on the impossibility of ordaining women to the priesthood. In 1998 he resigned from his priestly ministry in protest against Pope John Paul II’s decrees Ordinatio sacerdotalis and Ad Tuendam Fidem, which prohibited further discussion of the women priests’ issue in the Catholic Church.

== Early years ==
Wijngaards was born on 30 September 1935 from Dietze van Hoesel and Dr Nicolaas Carel Heinrich Wijngaards, both Dutch citizens, in the Indonesian city of Surabaya. During World War II, his father was made to work on the infamous Burma Railway in Thailand, while John with his mother and three brothers were prisoners of war in Malang, Surakarta and Ambarawa. The family was repatriated to the Netherlands after the war.

== Studies ==
John Wijngaards joined the Mill Hill Missionaries and was ordained a priest in 1959. In Rome he obtained the Licentiate of Sacred Scripture at the Pontifical Biblical Institute and the Doctorate of Theology at the Pontifical Gregorian University (1963). His studies focused on The Formulas of the Deuteronomic Creed (dissertation, Brill, Leiden 1963). Further research resulted in The Dramatisation of Salvific History in the Deuteronomic Schools (Brill, Leiden 1969) and a 360-page commentary on the book of Deuteronomy in the well-known Dutch series of commentaries published by Romen & Zonen (Roermond 1971).

== Services in India ==
Wijngaards taught Sacred Scripture at St John's Major Seminary in Hyderabad, India (1963–1976). During that time he was instrumental in founding Amruthavani communication centre, Jeevan Jyoti theological institute for religious women and Jyotirmai, the statewide planning body for the Catholic dioceses of Andhra Pradesh. He served as part-time lecturer at the National Biblical Catechetical and Liturgical Centre in Bangalore and was, for a number of years, a member of the National Advisory Council of the Catholic Bishops’ Conference of India. At the same time he produced a number of books on Sacred Scripture including his well-known Background to the Gospels. Research on the ministries convinced him that the exclusion of women must be attributed to cultural obstacles, not to Scripture or Tradition. He urged the Indian hierarchy to start a process of exploring the full ordination of women.

== Worldwide responsibilities ==
After a spell as Vicar General of the Mill Hill Missionaries in London (1976–1982), he became Director of Housetop, an international centre of adult faith formation (1982–2009). During that time (1983–1998) he was also Professor of Sacred Scripture at the Missionary Institute London which was affiliated to Louvain Catholic University and Middlesex University. During this time he pioneered the ‘Walking on Water’ series of video courses for adult faith formation which were co-produced by 15 countries in all continents. He wrote the scripts for nine half-hour film stories. He also produced the acclaimed 2 ½ - hour film Journey to the Centre of Love of which he was both the scriptwriter and the executive producer (see awards below).

== Activism and laicization ==
In 1977 Wijngaards wrote Did Christ Rule out Women Priests? (McCrimmon, Great Wakering) in response to Inter Insigniores (1976), the declaration by the Congregation of the Doctrine of the Faith in which the Vatican's reasons for excluding women are clearly spelled out. In the decades that followed Rome reiterated its inability to confer ordination on women, culminating in Ordinatio sacerdotalis (1995) and subsequent documents by which the discussion by theologians was curtailed.

In protest, Wijngaards resigned from his priestly ministry on 17 September 1998. His request for official reduction to the status of a lay person was acknowledged by Rome on 21 February 2000.

Wijngaards has continued publishing his reasons for advocating the ordination of women to the Catholic priesthood in a series of books, notably The Ordination of Women in the Catholic Church and No Women in Holy Orders? In 1999 he established a website that has grown out to be the largest internet library with documentation on the ordination of women. Wijngaards said that speaking out does not undermine accepting the teaching authority of the Pope. He firmly opposed the illegal ordination of women outside the established structure of the Church, as is done in the Roman Catholic Womenpriests movement.

== Wijngaards Institute for Catholic Research ==
From 2005, Wijngaards focused on other issues he felt needed reform in the Catholic Church. He created a pastoral website to deal with the sexual code. He drafted the Catholic Scholars' Declaration on Authority in the Church which gained international support. His Centre was reshaped to become the Wijngaards Institute for Catholic Research. Its main purpose is to publish independent Catholic scholarly assessments as 'a progressive theological think tank'. The Institute submitted a 'Documented Appeal' to Pope Francis, urging him to restore the ancient ordained diaconate for women. In 2016 he initiated the Catholic Scholars' Statement on the Ethics of Using Contraceptives which was launched on a United Nations platform.

== Personal life ==
In 1998, after being laicized, Wijngaards married Jacqueline Clackson in a simple Church ceremony.

== Awards ==
- Grand Prix, as scriptwriter for Journey to the Centre of Love, Tenth International Catholic Film Festival, Warsaw 1995.
- The Marga Klompé Award, 2005.

== Death ==
Wijngaards died on 2 January 2025, at the age of 89.

== Bibliography ==
- The Formulas of the Deuteronomic Creed (Brill, Leiden 1963)
- The Dramatization of Salvific History in the Deuteronomic Schools (Brill, Leiden, 1969)
- Background to the Gospels (St Paul's, Delhi 1970)
- God's Word to Israel (TPI, Ranchi 1971)
- Did Christ Rule Out Women Priests? (McCrimmons, Great Wakering 1977)
- Communicating God’s Word (McCrimmons, Great Wakering 1978)
- Reading God’s Word to Others (ATC, Bangalore 1981)
- Experiencing Jesus (Ave Maria Press, Notre Dame 1981)
- Inheriting the Master’s Cloak (Ave Maria Press, Notre Dame 1985)
- The Gospel of John and his Letters (Michael Glazier, Wilmington 1986)
- The Spirit in John (Michael Glazier, Wilmington 1987)
- God Within Us (Collins, London 1988)
- My Galilee My People (Housetop, London 1990)
- For The Sake of His People (McCrimmons, Great Wakering 1990)
- Together in My Name (Housetop, London 1991)
- I Have No Favourites (Housetop, London 1992)
- How to Make Sense of God (Sheed & Ward, Kansas City 1995)
- The Ordination of Women in the Catholic Church. Unmasking a Cuckoo’s Egg Tradition (Darton, Longman & Todd, London 2001)
- No Holy Orders for Women? The Ancient Women Deacons (Canterbury Press, London 2002; Herder & Herder, New York 2006)
- The Ordained Women Deacons of the Church's First Millennium (Canterbury Press, London 2011)
- AMRUTHA. What the Pope's man found out about the Law of Nature (Author House, Bloomington 2011)
- What they don't teach you in Catholic College. Women in the priesthood and the mind of Christ (Acadian House, Lafayette)
- Ten Commandments for Church Reform. Memoir of a Catholic Priest (Acadian House, Lafayette 2021)

== Sources ==
- Who’s Who in the World 1996 (Marquis Publications), p. 508.
- Who’s Who in Catholic Life 2009 (Gabriel Communications, Manchester), p. 391.
