= George V. Pixley =

American Christian theologian (1937–2023)

The Reverend George Pixley
- Born: March 29, 1937; Chicago, Illinois, U.S.
- Died: July 17, 2023 (aged 86)
- Other name: Jorge V. Pixley
- Spouse: Janyce Babcock

Ecclesiastical career
- Religion: Christianity (Baptist)
- Ordained: 1963

Academic background
- Education: Wheaton College; Kalamazoo College; University of Chicago (PhD)

Academic work
- Discipline: Theology; biblical studies
- School or tradition: Liberation theology; process philosophy
- Institutions: Baptist Seminary of Mexico; Managua Baptist Seminary; Claremont School of Theology
- Notable works: God's Kingdom (1981); On Exodus (1989); Biblical Israel (1991); Jeremiah (2004)

George V. Pixley (March 29, 1937 – July 19, 2023) was an American Christian theologian.

== Biography ==
Pixley was born in Chicago. He completed his undergraduate studies in Wheaton College (Illinois) and in Kalamazoo College, where he met and married Janyce Babcock. In the Faculty of Theology of the University of Chicago, he obtained a PhD in Biblical Studies. In 1963, Pixley was ordained as a Baptist pastor, and he was appointed professor of Bible at the Evangelical Seminary of Puerto Rico. In 1969 or 1970 he was invited to teach lectures at the Evangelical Higher Institute of Theological Studies ISEDET, in Buenos Aires, where he worked too, as a professor at the Lutheran Theological Faculty. Between 1975 and 1984 he was professor at the Baptist Seminary of Mexico, as well as professor of History of Israel at the Theological Institute of Higher Studies of Mexico City. In 1985, he returned to the United States, but decided to go to Managua, where he taught at the Managua Baptist Seminary between 1986 and 2002.

In October 2002, he and his wife retired and since then reside in California, where he is Director of Latin America Project, in the Center for Process Studies at Claremont School of Theology.

Pixley died on July 19, 2023, at the age of 86.

== Theology ==
He is an exponent of the radical academic line of liberation theology. Pixley has produced a synthesis of biblical studies, liberation theology, and process philosophy. According to Franz Hinkelammert, recent Pixley's work on the theology and Alfred North Whitehead's process philosophy shows that the liberation theology has entered a process of renewal. Pixley opens up to the dimension of God, to the "God's drama in the history", especially when he examines the book of Job. In all his argumentation, he defends the "option for the poor": God is the God of all, rich and poor, but "if he did not choose the option for the poor, he would be a partial God in favor of the rich", then, it would be an option against the poor.

== Books ==
- Pluralismo de tradiciones en la religión biblica. Buenos Aires: La Aurora, 1971.
- God's Kingdom: A Guide for Biblical Study. Maryknoll, N.Y.: Orbis Books, 1981.
- El libro de Job: comentario bíblico latinoamericano. San José, Costa Rica: Seminario Bíblico Latinoamericano, 1982.
- On Exodus: A Liberation Perspective. Maryknoll, N.Y.: Orbis Books, 1989.
- Biblia y liberación de los pobres: ensayos de teología bíblica latinoamericana. México: Centro Antonio de Montesinos, 1986.
- La mujer en la construcción de la iglesia: una perspectiva bautista desde America Latina y el Caribe. San José, Costa Rica: DEI, 1986.
- The Bible, the Church, and the Poor (The Option for the poor, with Clodovis Boff); Maryknoll, N.Y.: Orbis Books, 1989.
- Hacia una fe evangélica latinoamericanista: una perspectiva bautista (con Israel Belo de Azevedo). San José, Costa Rica: DEI, 1988.
- Biblical Israel: A People's History. Minneapolis: Augsburg Fortress Publishers, 1991.
- Vida en el espíritu: el proyecto mesiánico de Jesús después de la resurrección. Managua: CIEETS, 1993.
- La resurrección de Jesús, el Cristo : una interpretación desde la lucha por la vida. San José, Costa Rica: DEI, 1999.
- Por una iglesia laica: historia de los y las creyentes que se congregan en la Convención Bautista de Nicaragua. Managua: CBN, 1999.
- Jeremiah. St. Louis, MO: Chalice Press, 2004.
- Teología de la liberación y Filosofía procesual. El Dios liberador en la Biblia. Quito: Abya Yala, 2009.

All his works have been published in Spanish or English; several have been translated to Portuguese, a book to French and German, and other to Indonesian.
