= Evangelical Seminary of Puerto Rico =

Private mainline Protestant seminary in Río Piedras, Puerto Rico

Coordinates: 18.406725°N 66.052327°W

The Evangelical Seminary of Puerto Rico – or Seminario Evangélico de Puerto Rico (SEPR) in Spanish – is a private mainline Protestant seminary in Río Piedras, Puerto Rico.

The seminary was founded on September 11, 1919 (106 years ago) by a group of theological schools and biblical institutes of the Protestant denominations that came to Puerto Rico after the Spanish-American War. It offers graduate studies in religion and is accredited by the Association of Theological Schools in the United States and Canada, the Middle States Commission on Higher Education, and the Council on Higher Education of Puerto Rico. In 2018, the seminary was sponsored by several denominations, including the American Baptist Churches USA, the Iglesia Evangélica Unida de Puerto Rico (IEUPR), the United Church of Christ, the Evangelical Lutheran Church in America, the United Methodist Church, and the Presbyterian Church (U.S.A.) and the Christian Church (Disciples of Christ).

== Notable staff and students ==
- Carlos Cardoza-Orlandi (student)
- Justo L. González (teacher)
- Agustina Luvis Núñez (student and dean)
- Luis N. Rivera-Pagán (student and teacher)
