= Saint John Vianney Seminary =

Saint John Vianney Seminary may refer to:

- Saint John Vianney Seminary (Minnesota), a college seminary in Saint Paul, Minnesota (Minneapolis-St. Paul area)
- Saint John Vianney Seminary (Denver), a theological seminary in Denver, Colorado
- Saint John Vianney Seminary (Florida), a college seminary in Westchester, Florida (Miami area)
- St John Vianney Seminary, Pretoria, National seminary, South Africa
