= New feminism =

Form of feminism

New feminism is a form of feminism that emphasizes the integral complementarity of women and men, rather than the superiority of men over women or women over men; further, it advocates for respecting persons from conception to natural death.

New feminism, as a form of difference feminism, supports the idea that men and women have different strengths, perspectives, and roles, while advocating for the equal worth and dignity of both sexes. Among its basic concepts are that biological differences are significant and do not compromise sexual equality. New feminism holds that women should be valued in their role as child bearers, that women and men are individuals equal in worth, and that in social, economic, and legal senses they should be equal, while accepting the differences between the sexes.

== History ==
The term was originally used in Britain in the 1920s to distinguish new feminists from traditional mainstream suffragist feminism. These women, also referred to as welfare feminists, were particularly concerned with motherhood, like their opposite numbers in Germany at the time, Helene Stöcker and her Bund für Mutterschutz. New feminists campaigned strongly in favour of such measures as family allowances paid directly to mothers. They were also largely supportive of protective legislation in industry. A major proponent of this was Eleanor Rathbone of the suffragist-successor society, the National Union of Societies for Equal Citizenship.

New feminists were opposed mainly by young women, especially those in the Six Point Group, particularly Winifred Holtby, Vera Brittain, and Dorothy Evans, who saw this as a retrograde step towards the separate spheres ideology of the 19th century. They were particularly opposed to protective legislation, which they saw as being in practice restrictive legislation, which kept women out of better-paid jobs on the pretext of health and welfare considerations.

=== Recent use ===
In recent years, the term has been revived by feminists responding to Pope John Paul II's call for a "'new feminism' which rejects the temptation of imitating models of 'male domination' in order to acknowledge and affirm the true genius of women in every aspect of the life of society and overcome all discrimination, violence and exploitation . . . 'Reconcile people with life'". John Paul II links the new feminism of pro-life, pro-person advocacy to the feminine genius identified in his 1988 apostolic letter Mulieris Dignitatem, or, On the Dignity and Vocation of Women. In section 30 of this letter, John Paul II identified women as having a "genius that belongs" to them and called on them to use it to restore "sensitivity for human beings in every circumstance. Women are mothers and caregivers as well as participants in every realm of human endeavor. He describes the 'feminine genius' as including empathy, interpersonal relations, emotive capacity, subjectivity, communication, intuition and personalization. In the controversial section 24 of this letter, John Paul II defends the equality of women and argues that husbands and wives are to be mutually submissive to each other.

John Paul II had begun his theologically-based affirmation of integral gender complementarity in his Wednesday audiences between 1979 and 1984, in what is now compiled as the Theology of the Body. In this work, he describes his belief that men and women are formed as complementary human beings for the sake of loving and being loved.

John Paul II continued his call for women to become advocates of humanity in his Apostolic Letter to Women prior to the 1995 Beijing Women's conference.

Since then, women interested in advocating for the person--along with their male collaborators--have been developing personalist feminism. "Personalist feminism" was a term first coined by Prudence Allen to describe the feminism called for by John Paul II. Women have also been developing new feminism as a philosophical theory about sexual complementarity. They agree that being the equal to men in their professional and social capacities does not require denying their physical differences as women nor the importance of being a mother whether physically or spiritually.

== Theory ==
=== Integral sex complementarity ===
While the Greeks acknowledged the possibility of sex complementarity, systematic developments into this philosophy of the person did not begin until Augustine of Hippo, who recognized the implications of the Christian doctrine of the resurrection. The first western philosopher to articulate a complete theory of sex complementarity was Hildegard of Bingen, a 12th-century Benedictine nun. Her advances were soon buried by the 13th century Aristotelian Revolution, and the lack of higher education for women in the following centuries.

Philosophical developments in the concept of integral gender complementarity were popularized in the early 20th century by two students of Edmund Husserl: Dietrich von Hildebrand and Edith Stein. Von Hildebrand argued against the "terrible anti-personalism" of his age, stating that it is the "general dissimilarity in the nature of both which enables... a real complementary relationship". Stein revived the metaphysics of Thomas Aquinas to argue that a difference in bodies constitutes a difference in spirit, that the soul is not unisex. Stein's argument has been criticized for not realizing that the immateriality of the human soul transcends the limitations of the body as Aquinas argues. New feminist theories were also influenced by the Personalist and Phenomenology movements of the early 20th century.

Integral complementarity differs from fractional complementarity, in that it argues that men and women are each whole persons in and of themselves, and, together, equal more than the sum of their parts. The concept of fractional complementarity argues that a man and woman each make up a part of a person. By this theory, when they are joined together, they then comprise one, composite being.

=== Meaning of the body ===
New feminists promote an understanding of the human person as one who is made in the image and likeness of God (imago Dei) for the purpose of union and communion. They see distinct differences in the ways in which men and women make a sincere gift of themselves through the 'nuptial meaning of the body', and see these gifts as shedding light on the mysteries of God and their own vocation, mission and dignity.

Other ideas promoted by new feminists include:

- that the different bodily structures of men and women lead both to different lived experiences.
- that the different ways in which men and women give life physically are linked to emotional, spiritual, and intellectual dispositions.
- that fulfillment as a woman means exercising maternal care, whether physically or spiritually. New feminists believe that whether or not they do it well, women are physically structured to be mothers, to develop life with their wombs. They purport the idea that the physical capacity for motherhood connects with the psychological, spiritual and emotional characteristics that women would need to be mothers.
- that regardless of whether or not a woman ever gives birth, she has the capacity for maternal love in spiritual motherhood.

==== The feminine genius ====
The phrase "the feminine genius" is used to describe the genius that John Paul II identified as belonging to women, “which can ensure sensitivity for human beings in every circumstance.” He argues that this sensitivity is linked to maternity. Work on unpacking the nature of this link can be found in various anthologies, such as Women in Christ: Toward a New Feminism (2004) and Woman as Prophet in the Home and the World (2016). The characteristics of these feminine genius-maternity links raise many open questions. For example:

Emphasis on the person
Because they can receive and develop life within their wombs, women can have a special openness to the new person - their child. This includes the capacity to unify all of humankind because people were all once united with their mothers in their wombs. The open questions here include the degree to which it takes a decision to consider every human person as some one's child and the ways in which such a decision has implications for social policy, the arts, and human culture.
Empathy
Because of the need to care for their developing children, within their wombs and as infants, caring mothers tend to become more empathetic. The open questions on this characteristic include whether the development of empathy is physiological or the result of the choice to be caring. They also include evaluating Edith Stein's argument that women have "a profound need to share [their lives] with another and, consequently, a capacity for unselfish love, for commitment, a capacity to transcend the self...".
Receptivity
Only women are created with a physical empty space inside of themselves capable of receiving another person and conceiving new life. Through pregnancy, women give a gift of self - their own bodies - so that others, their children, can receive the gift of life. The open questions here include the correlation between sexual receptivity and other kinds of receptivity, e.g. emotional, psychological, spiritual, intellectual and so forth.
Protection of life
Because of the new human life within their wombs, women have a special vocation to care for their own children and a special sensitivity to the needs of all those who cannot care for themselves - the weak, the poor, the outcast - all those whose life is not valued. New feminists believe it to be a particular injustice when women support abortion, infanticide, embryonic stem cell research, or in-vitro fertilization. The open questions here concern the best ways to meet the needs of women and offer the support necessary to end these injustices and build a more humane society. Personalist feminists argue that the collaboration of men is so necessary for these tasks that they too need to be feminists.
Sanctity and modesty
Women have a sense of modesty to guard against the exploitation or objectification of that holy mystery. Only total love - unconditional commitment and mutual self-giving in marriage - "has the capacity to absorb the shame of human nature." The key to this absorption is valuing sexuality as the embodiment of a person who is dearly loved. New feminists are typically against what Russell D. Moore termed "the Concubine Culture" of couples living together and having sex outside of marriage.
Supportive of men
By enabling men to become fathers, women give men a great gift. While he shares in parenthood, man always remains outside the process of pregnancy and birth. In many ways, women facilitate a man's fatherhood and parenting skills. For New feminists, the fulfillment of masculinity means being a father, whether physically or spiritually. In order to become a physical father, a man must give away his semen, in order to create new life. All spiritual fathers, according to New Feminists, have a responsibility to protect the mutual self-giving of man and woman. This sense of protection of their wives and families is also built into a man's physical capacities in the greater physical strength of men, generally speaking, as well as their psychological need to feel competent and capable. There are many unresolved questions here include the ways in which women facilitate fatherhood, substantiating the claim that fatherhood is key to male fulfillment, and the ways in which fatherhood is imaged in the Trinity and by Christ.
There is controversy as not all new feminists accept John Paul II's argument in sections 23-24 of Mulieris Dignitatem that due to Genesis 1:27 and Ephesians 5:21, husband and wives are to be mutually submissive. For example, in Eastern Orthodoxy, spiritual fatherhood means spiritual priesthood – the offering of a man's body and blood for the sanctification of the world. It was because Jesus gave his body and blood away both as a sacrifice for his Church and as a gift to the Church in the form of the Eucharist that new spiritual life could be conceived. "A man is 'head' of his wife not to stroke his own ego, but in order to give up his body for her" and thus create new life. As keepers of the Eucharist, men are entrusted with the body and blood of Christ. All men, whether single or married, are entrusted with woman – the body of the Church. "She is their Eucharist."

==== New feminist positions ====
Distinction, not discrimination
"Discrimination is an evil, but distinction is God's design." New feminists claim that men and women are different and that this difference affects the way they live their lives, what they care about, and their strengths and weaknesses. Women can fulfill their vocational calling by acting as spiritual mothers in whatever their occupation: as wife, mother, consecrated woman, working professional, or single woman. Differences between the sexes should never be used to unilaterally discriminate except in cases when a task is contingent upon a person being of a certain sex, e.g., women give birth and only men can be priests in Catholic and Eastern Orthodox Churches.
Marriage as communion
New feminists consider marriage to be a reciprocal self-giving of persons in free, total, faithful and fruitful communion. This means that marriage is more than a "partnership"; it is a communion of persons.
Celebration of the family and the home
New feminists argue that a true feminism is not just about women, it is about the Family – both individually and collectively in the Church and Humanity. The family is the foundational unit of society, yet many women do not have the choice to stay at home with their children because of social, economic or political pressures. Women's work as mothers and in the home must be valued as good in and of itself.
Love and service, not power, domination or bitterness
Dismayed by what they see as the bitterness, hatred, or retribution of many feminists against men or other women for current or past injustices, new feminists argue that men and women should cooperate with one another in interpersonal communion. This means giving of themselves in mutual service and love.
True freedom remembers purpose, including oughts as well as rights
In order for men and women to be truly free, new feminists assert that they must honor the Creator and love accordingly. Philosophy and Religion, then, are essential components in the search for how men and women should and ought to act for "a higher truth or good", not just how they want or can act. New feminists assert that people must gratefully remember God loves them as shown by creation; they must recognize that life, in some way, is a gift and not a mere thing which a person can claim as his or her exclusive property.
Fruitfulness, not just productivity
To be fruitful is to enable others to love and be loved. While productivity is valuable, helpful and necessary, it must be geared towards respect and love for the person – even though it takes longer, requires patience and the cooperation of others, and is appreciated not measured. Every act of service is a witness to the worth of the human person and thus promotes the progress of the whole human race.
Fertility, not sterility
Many new feminists assert that fertility is a natural, healthy biological process, not a disease that women need to take the Pill to be cured from. If women respect their fertility – their potential for physical and spiritual motherhood, they demand respect from others and deny that their sexuality is reducible to self-gratification. This devaluing of sexuality occurs with the use of contraceptives. Thus, the vast majority of new feminists discuss the spiritual, emotional, and physical benefits for men and women by following natural family planning instead of utilizing contraception.

=== Proponents ===
Contemporary proponents include Pia de Solenni, Janet E. Smith, Katrina Zeno, Elizabeth Fox-Genovese, R. Mary Lemmons, Colleen Carroll Campbell, Mary Beth Bonacci, Sister Prudence Allen, Alice von Hildebrand, Kimberly Hahn, Helen Alvare, Dorinda C. Bordlee, Erika Bachiochi, and Mary Ellen Bork. The work of earlier Catholic thinkers on masculinity and femininity, such as Hildegard of Bingen, Edith Stein and G. E. M. Anscombe, has also become recently influential in the development of new feminism. Though primarily originally in the thought of John Paul II, the movement also includes prominent non-Catholics, like Jewish author Wendy Shalit and Protestant activist Enola Aird.

== Critiques ==
Critics of the movement argue that it was created by a patriarchal structure for its own maintenance. As commented by Sister of Mercy Mary Aquin O'Neill, director of the Mount Agnes Theological Center for Women in Baltimore, "[i]t will always mean that men are defining women and telling women what it is like to be a woman." According to this view, until women are members of this higher authority, they can never make authoritative decisions about their perspectives because they are excluded from the vote. Those critics maintain that no movement that opposes abortion and birth control in the form of artificial contraception can be positive for women, and that new feminism is a form of gender or biological determinism, which may be seen as old prejudices in a new guise.

This modern use of new feminism by the Catholic Church attempts to stray away from the traditional sentiments of the 1912 Catholic Encyclopedia that women and men do not belong together in the political, economic, and social spheres. It was never clarified as to why these changes were made, and the Holy See still followed many premises that shared the same anthropological arguments of the 1912 Catholic Encyclopedia. Another critique of new feminism is that Pope John Paul II's positions can too easily be tied to more traditional Catholic teachings. This could cause the continuation of a worldview that negates the ability for men and women to successfully work together in a professional and/or social setting.

== See also ==
- Natural family planning
- Pro-life feminism
