= Prudence Allen =

American philosopher (born 1940)

Sister Prudence Allen, RSM
- Born: Christine Hope Allen; 21 July 1940 (age 86); Oneida, New York

Education
- Education: Claremont Graduate School

Philosophical work
- Region: Western philosophy
- School: Thomistic personalism and new feminism
- Institutions: Concordia University, Montreal Saint John Vianney Theological Seminary
- Main interests: Philosophy of gender
- Notable works: The Concept of Woman

Sister Mary Prudence Allen RSM (born 21 July 1940) is an American philosopher who converted to Catholicism and joined the Religious Sisters of Mercy. In 2014 she was appointed to the International Theological Commission for a five-year term by Pope Francis. Her areas of specialization include the history of philosophy, philosophical anthropology, philosophy of woman, existentialism, and personalism. Areas of competence include metaphysics, philosophy of God, epistemology and logic.

== Biography ==
Allen was born Christine Hope Allen in Oneida, New York, on July 21, 1940. In 1962, she graduated with a B.A in philosophy cum laude from the University of Rochester in New York. She completed one year of graduate study, while serving as Residence Director at State University of New York at Buffalo. Having received a full tuition scholarship from Claremont Graduate School, she moved to California in 1963. She joined the Catholic Church in 1964 and married one year later. In 1967, she earned her doctorate in philosophy from the Claremont Graduate School. During this time, she and her husband had two sons, whom she helped raise while teaching philosophy as an assistant professor (1969–1977) at Concordia University in Montreal, Quebec, Canada, when it was still called Sir George Williams University. Meanwhile, her marriage was annulled in 1972. She was promoted to associate professor of philosophy (1977–1993). In 1983, she was accepted into the novitiate of the Religious Sisters of Mercy. She took perpetual vows in 1990.

While at Concordia, Sister Allen received almost yearly grants from the Social Sciences and Humanities Research Council of Canada for her work in the conceptual history of women (1979–1995); these totaled $187,699. She also team taught an introductory course in woman studies, and she received innovative teaching development grants. Concordia University promoted her to full professor in 1993, and she continued teaching until 1996, when she retired as a Distinguished Professor Emerita.

In 1998, she moved to Denver to develop the philosophy program at Saint John Vianney Seminary. From 2000 to 2003, she was the founding chair of the Seminary's philosophy department. At this time, she began developing materials for ENDOW (Educating on the Nature and Dignity of Woman). In 2004, she began an eleven-year appointment as a full professor in this newly formed department. She was also appointed Consultant to the Pontifical Council for the Laity in a Study Seminar on "Men and Women: Diversity and Mutual Complementarity." In 2005, she began a nine-year term serving on the St. Thomas Advisory Committee for Women, Culture, and Society Program at the University of St. Thomas in Houston, Texas. In 2008, she served as a Consultant to Rome John Paul II Institute on Gender Identity Issues. From 2011 to 2014, when she retired, she held the Charles J. Chaput Endowed Chair of Philosophy, at St. John Vianney Theological Seminary, Denver, Colorado. From 2014–2016, she was the Bishop's Archivist for the Diocese of Lancaster, England. Also, in 2014, at the invitation of Pope Francis, she began a five-year term serving on the International Theological Commission with four other women (prior to this only two women had served on this commission). During that term, she helped author "Synodality in the life and mission of the Church".

== Work ==
Allen has stated that she considers herself a New Feminist philosopher, citing the influence of Pope John Paul II on her writing. She describes feminism as type of humanism and coined the term "personalist feminism." The philosophy of the human person and of human community is a major focus of her writing. She agrees with Aristotle's understanding of the relationship between soul and body, as well as his approach to science, but opposes his view that human males are superior to females. Like other feminists, she wants to eliminate the discrimination and violence that many women face, but, as a New or Personalist Feminist, she opposes abortion. She also argues that gender identity is properly based on sex, that there is a conflict between gender reality and gender ideology, and that gender reality needs to be regained.

Allen's three-volume magnum opus, The Concept of Woman, is the culmination of a lifetime of the scholarly investigation into how womanhood has been understood throughout the history of philosophy. Allen argues that there has been a true development in the understanding of gender leading to integral complementarity. This understanding builds upon the thought of Aristotle and Augustine. She discusses three understandings of gender throughout history: gender polarity, gender unity, and gender complementarity. Gender polarity can appear either in its traditional form, in which men are considered superior to women, or in a reversed form, in which women are seen as superior. In its traditional form, gender polarity became dominant in philosophical circles for centuries under the influence of Aristotle. Gender unity holds that there are no significant differences between men and women. Gender complementarity can appear in one of two forms—fractional complementarity, in which men and women form two halves of a whole, and integral complementarity, in which men and women are whole on their own and together form something greater than two wholes. Allen holds to the integral complementarity position.

== Honors ==
- 1962 – Fanny R. Bigelow Award to the Graduating Senior Woman who had contributed the most leadership to the University of Rochester, Rochester,
- 1972 – First prize, Fredonia University Philosophical Essay Contest for "Woman and Persons", New York State.
- 1973 – Sir George Williams University Student Life Award for Outstanding Contribution to quality of Student Life, Montreal, Quebec, Canada.
- 1988 – Air Canada West Island Chronicle Heart of Gold Award for Contribution to Public Service, Montreal, Quebec, Canada
- 2003 – Thomas Aquinas Medal, University of Dallas, January 28
- 2003 – Shared 2003 Second Place Award for Gender Issues by the Catholic Press Association of the United States and Canada with Eerdmans, Publisher for The Concept of Woman: Vol. II — The Early Humanist Reformation 1250–1500.
- 2004 – The Cardinal Wright Award, Fellowship of Catholic Scholars, September 25, Pittsburgh, PA.
- 2005 – Shared 2005 Third Place Award for Gender Issues by the Catholic Press Association Book Award with Eerdmans, Publisher and Michele Schumacher, ed., for two chapters in Women in Christ.
- 2008 – Doctor of Humane Letters, Honoris Causa, in recognition of her contributions to the intellectual life of the Church on the nature and dignity of women, St Charles Borromeo Seminary, Overbrook, Wynnewood, Pennsylvania, May 22, 2008.
- 2012 – Inaugural Annual Humanitarian Leadership Award, Siena Symposium, St. Thomas University, St. Paul, Minnesota, April 23, 2012.
- 2014 – Scholarly Excellence Award, American Maritain Association, Providence Rhode Island.
- 2017 – Sixth Annual Human Dignity Lecture, McGrath Institute for Church Life and the Office of Human Dignity and Life Initiatives at the University of Notre Dame, South Bend, IN.
- 2018 – University of Notre Dame's McGrath Institute for Church Life held a day-long conference to celebrate the completion of Allen's Concept of Woman trilogy.
- 2021 – Aquinas Medal, American Catholic Philosophical Association, St. Louis, MO

== Bibliography ==
All papers are archived at Concordia University Archives in Montreal

=== Books ===
- 2016. The Concept of Woman: Search for Communion of Persons (1500–2015). Grand Rapids: Eerdmans Press, 2016, pp. 550.
- 2008. Discover your Dignity: A Woman's Journey through Life: Part II (Denver: Endow, 2008), in collaboration with Sr. Lydia Marie Allen, RSM, Sr. Moria DeBono, RSM, and Sr. Marie Paul Lockerd, RSM.
- 2007. Discover your Dignity: A Woman's Journey through Life: Part I (Denver: Endow, 2008), in collaboration with Sr. Lydia Marie Allen, RSM, Sr. Moria DeBono, RSM, and Sr. Marie Paul Lockerd, RSM.
- 2002. The Concept of Woman: The Early Humanist Reformation (1250–1500), Grand Rapids: Eerdmans Press, 2002, pp. 1256 rpt. in two parts: pt1
- 1997. The Concept of Woman: The Aristotelian Revolution (750 B.C. – 1250 A.D.), Second Edition with new preface and updated bibliography, Grand Rapids: Eerdman's Press, 1997, pp. 583.
- 1985. The Concept of Woman: The Aristotelian Revolution (750 B.C. – 1250 A.D.) First Edition, Montreal and London: Eden Press, 1985, pp. 577.
- 1967. PhD Dissertation, "Strawson's Individuals: Part I" (A consideration of Strawson's Transcendental Argument in Descriptive Metaphysics as applied to Descartes, Leibnitz, and Hume), Ann Arbor, University Microfilms, 1967.

=== Academic chapters ===
- 2015. "Four Principles of Complementarity," in Not Just Good, but Beautiful: The Complementary Relationship Between Man and Woman, eds. Helen Alvare and Steven Lopes (Walden, NY: Plough, 2015).
- 2014. "The Passion of Edith Stein-Revisited," in Edith Stein Volume, ed. Kathleen Haney (Washington DC: Institute of Carmelite Studies (ICS) Press, 2014.)
- 2009. "Communion in Community." in Council of Major Superiors of Women Religious ed., The Foundations of Religious Life: Revisiting the Vision (South Bend: Ave Marie Press, spring 2009), chapter 4:113–156.
- 2008. "The Decree on the Appropriate Renewal of Religious Life – Perfectae Caritatis," co-authored with Sr. Mary Judith O'Brien, R.S.M., in Vatican II: Renewal Within Tradition, eds. Matthew L. Lamb and Matthew Levering (Oxford: Oxford University Press, 2008), Chapter12:251–270.
- 2008. "Theory of Women's Identity, " in Edith Stein: Seeker of Truth (Denver: Endow, 2008), in collaboration with Elizabeth Mitchell and Terry Wright, Chapter 4: 53–70.
- 2003. "La Philosophie de la relation dans le nouveau féminisme de Jean-Paul II" in Femmes dans le Christ, vers un nouveau Féminisme ed. Michele Schumacher (Toulouse: Éditions du Carmel, 2003): 21–74.
- 2003. "Philosophy of Relation in John Paul II's New Feminism," in Women in Christ: Toward a New Feminism, ed. Michele Schumacher (Grand Rapids: Eerdmans, 2003): 67–104.
- 2003. "Person and Complementarity in Fides et ratio," in The Two Wings of Catholic Thought: Essays on Fides et ratio, ed. David Foster. (Washington DC: Catholic University of America Press, 2003), pp. 36–68.
- 2003. "La Philosophie de la relation dans le nouveau féminisme de Jean-Paul II" in Femmes dans le Christ, vers un nouveau Féminisme ed. Michele Schumacher (Toulouse: Éditions du Carmel, 2003): 21–74.
- 2003. "Philosophy of Relation in John Paul II's New Feminism," in Women in Christ: Toward a New Feminism, ed. Michele Schumacher (Grand Rapids: Eerdmans, 2003): 67–104.
- 2003. "Person and Complementarity in Fides et ratio," in The Two Wings of Catholic Thought: Essays on Fides et ratio, ed. David Foster. (Washington DC: Catholic University of America Press, 2003), pp. 36–68.
- 1995. "Hildegard of Bingen," in Encyclopedia of Philosophy: Supplement (New York: Macmillan Publishing Company, 1995).
- 1995. "Edith Stein: The Human Person as Male and Female, in "Images of the Human: The Philosophy of the Human Person in a Religious Context, (Chicago: Loyola University Press, 1995)., Introduction, Selected Text, and Commentary: pp. 397–432.
- 1990. "Descartes, The Concept of Woman, and The French Revolution" in Revolution, Violence, and Equality, Yaeger Hudson and Creighton Peden, eds. (Studies in Social and Political Theory, Vol. 10, no. 3, Lewiston/ Queenston/ Lampeter: The Edwin Mellen Press, (1990), pp. 61–78.
- 1983. "Women in Colonial French America", in Women in Religion in America (The Colonial and Revolutionary Periods), Volume II, Rosemary Radford Ruether and Rosemary Keller, eds, San Francisco: Harper and Row (1983), pp. 79–132.
- 1980. "Bridging the Gulf of Meaning," The R.V.H. Manual on Palliative Care, New York: Arno Press, (1980), pp. 231–242.
- 1979. "Nietzsche's Ambivalence about Women," The Sexism of Social and Political Theory, Lorenne Clark and Lynda Lange eds., Toronto: University of Toronto Press, (1979), pp. 117–133.
- 1979. "Who was Rebecca?", revised as "On Me Be the Curse, My Son", Chapter 10 in Encounter with the Text, Issues in Hermeneutics with special attention to Genesis 25–35, ed. Martin Buss, Montana: Scholar's Press, Semaia, (1979), pp. 159–172.
- 1976. "Sex-Identity and Personal Identity", Contemporary Canadian Philosophy Series, Vol 1: Values and the Quality of Life, eds. W. Shea and J. King Farlow, Toronto: Neal Watson, Academic Publications, Inc., (1976), pp. 93–125.
- 1974. "Women's Liberation Movement: Some Effects on Women, Men and Children", in Configurations, Raymond Prince, ed., Lexington and Toronto: D.C. Heath and Company, (1974), pp. 103–113.
- 1972. "Woman and Persons", in Mother Was Not a Person, Margaret Anderson, ed., Montreal: Content Publishing, (1972), pp. 194–204.

=== Journal articles ===
- 2008. "Friendship, Gender, and Vocation," Josephinum: Journal of Theology, vol 15, no 1 (Winter/spring 2008):102–139.
- 2006. "Man-Woman Complementarity: The Catholic Inspiration," Logos: A Journal of Catholic Thought and Culture 9:3 (summer 2006):1–22. Complete text online posted on the Website of the Pontifical Council for the Laity: Women Section [Giugno/June 2008].
- 2005. "Teaching Modern and Contemporary Philosophy in Seminary," Co-authored with Terry Wright, PhD, Seminary Journal of the National Catholic Educational Association, vol 11, no. 1 ( Spring 2005):22–26.
- 2004. "How Catholic Philosophy Can Engage Secular Culture in Education," Maritain Studies, Vol. XX (2004):106–147.
- 2004. "Where is Our Conscience? Aquinas and Modern and Contemporary Philosophers. International Philosophical Quarterly, vol.44, no.3, issue 175 (September 2004): 335–373.
- 2002. "The Passion of Edith Stein," Fides Quaerens Intellectum: A Journal of Theology, Philosophy, and History, Vol. I, no. 2 (winter 2001):201–250.
- 2002. "Venerable Catherine McAuley and The Dignity of the Human Person," New Blackfriars (February 2002): 52–72.
- 1998. "Can Feminism Be a Humanism,?" Études Maritainnes/Maritain Studies, No. 14 (1998): pp. 109–140.
- 1996. "Foundational Virtues for Community," Études Maritainnes/Maritain Studies, No. 12 (1996), pp. 133–149.
- 1993. "Sex and Gender Differentiation in Hildegard of Bingen and Edith Stein," Communio: International Catholic Review, Vol.XX, no.2, (Summer, 1993), pp. 389–414.
- 1992. co-authored with Filippo Salvatore, "Lucrezia Marinelli and Woman's Identity in Late Italian Renaissance," Renaissance and Reformation, New Series Vol. XXVIII, no.4 (1992), pp. 5–39.
- 1992. "A Woman and A Man as Prime Analogical Beings," American Catholic Philosophical Quarterly, Vol. LXVI, No. 4, (1992), pp. 456–82.
- 1992. "Fuller's Synergetics and Sex Complementarity," International Philosophical Quarterly, xxxii, no 1, issue 125, March 1992, pp. 3–16.
- 1990. "Integral Sex Complementarity and the Theology of Communion," in Communio: International Catholic Review, 17 (Winter, 1990), pp. 523–544.
- 1989. "Analogy and Human Community in Lublin Existential Personalism," The Toronto Journal of Theology, 5/2 Fall 1989, pp. 236–46.
- 1989. "Hildegard of Bingen's Philosophy of Sex Complementarity," Thought, Vol. 64, no. 254, Sept. 1989, pp. 231–241.
- 1987. "The Influence of Plato and Aristotle on The Concept of Woman in Medieval Jewish Philosophy," in Florigium, Vol 9, 1987, pp. 89–111.
- 1987. "Aristotelian and Cartesian Revolutions in the Philosophy of Man and Woman" and "Response" in Dialogue, Journal of the Canadian Philosophical Association, XXVI/2, Summer 1987, pp. 263–279.
- 1987. "Two Medieval Views on Woman's Identity: Hildegard of Bingen and Thomas Aquinas," in Studies in Religion, Vol. 16, No. 1, 1987, pp. 21–36.
- 1987. "Soul, Body and Transcendence in St. Teresa of Avila," in Toronto Journal of Theology, Vol. 3, No. 3, Fall 1987, pp. 252–266.
- 1983. "Sex Unity, Polarity, or Complementarity?" in International Journal of Women's Studies, Vol. 6, Number 4, Sept./Oct. 1983, pp. 311–326.
- 1981. "Christ our Mother in Julian of Norwich," Studies in Religion, Vol. 10, 4, Fall 1981, pp. 32–39.
- 1980. "Integral Sex Complementarity and the Theology of Communion," Communio 17, winter 1980, 523–544.
- 1980. "Ideology Separates While the Heart Binds: Response to Lonergan's Prolegomena," Studies in Religion, 9/1, Winter, 1980, pp. 21–24.
- 1976. "Self-Creation and Loss of Self: Mary Daly and St. Teresa of Avila," Studies in Religion, Vol. 6, No. 1, 1976–1977, pp. 67–72.
- 1975. "Plato on Women, " Feminist Studies, Vol. 2, no.2/3, 1975, pp. 131–38.
- 1974. "Conceptual History as a Methodology in Women's Studies", McGill Journal of Education, Vol. X, No. 1, Spring 1974, pp. 49–58.
- 1971. "Can a Woman be Good in the Same Way as a Man?," Dialogue, Journal of the Canadian Philosophical Association, Vol. 10, 1971, No. 2, pp. 534–544.

=== Electronic Publications ===
- 2019. "Gabriel Marcel and the Discovery of Fatherhood," Church Life Journal, University of Notre Dame McGrath Institute, (March 20, 2019)
- 2016. "Catherine McAuley and the Dignity of the Human Person," MercyNews, the online newsletter of Mercy International Association (MIA), November 16, 2016.
- 2014. "Gender Reality," Solidarity: The Journal of Catholic Social Thought and Secular Ethics: Vol. 4: Iss. 1, Article 1. Available at: Gender Reality
- 2012. "Plato, Aristotle, and the Concept of Woman in Early Jewish Philosophy" Reposted on line' at Florilegiums website, University of New Brunswick http://journals.hil/unb.ca/index.php/flor
- 2011. "The Passion of Edith Stein Revisited" Reposted online at the Website of the Pontifical Council for the Laity: Women Section [November/December 2011].
- 2010. "Mulieris Dignitatem Twenty Years Later: An Overview of the Document and Challenges," Complete text online posted on the Website of the Pontifical Council for the Laity: Women Section [November/December 2010]
- 2009. "The Passion of Edith Stein Revisited", Festschrift to Honor Fr. Eleutherius Winnance's 100th Anniversary of Birth. Available at: http://www.philonoeses.org/SrPAllen.pdf [cited 08/July/09]: 1–22.
- 2008. "Man-Woman Complementarity: The Catholic Inspiration," Logos: A Journal of Catholic Thought and Culture 9:3 (summer 2006):1–22. (Complete text online posted on the Website of the Pontifical Council for the Laity: Women Section [Giugno/June 2008])

=== Articles published as proceedings of conferences ===
- 2016. "A Life Shared: The Complementarity of Jacques and Raissa Maritain," in The Wisdom of Youth: Essays Inspired by the Early Work of Jacques and Raissa Maritain, ed., Travis Dumsday (Washington D.C.: American Maritain Association, 2016): 33–48.
- 2015. "Gender Reality vs. Gender Ideology," in John P. Hittinger and Daniel C. Wagner, Thomas Aquinas: Teacher of Humanity: Proceedings from the First Conference of the Pontifical Academy of St. Thomas Aquinas held in the United States of America (Cambridge: Scholars Publishing, 2015).
- 2011. "Mary and the Vocation of Philosophers," in John P. Hittinger, ed, The Vocation of the Catholic Philosopher: From Maritain to John Paul II (Washington DC: American Maritain Association- Distributed by the Catholic University of America Press, 2011): 51–76.
- 2009. "Mulieris Dignitatem: Twenty Years Later: An Overview of the Document and Challenges," Ave Maria Law Review Vol 8, no 1 (Fall 2009): 13–47.
- 2008. "The Impact of Internet Use on the Spirituality of Communion," Proceedings of the Council of Major Superiors of Women Religious National Assembly, Theme: Putting on the Mind of Christ, National Shrine of Our Lady of the Snows, Belleville, Illinois, (Washington DC: CMSWR, October 2008): 57–78.
- 2007. "Analogy, Law and the Workplace: Complementarity, Conscience and the Common Good," in University of St. Thomas Law Journal, Symposium: Workplace Restructuring to Accommodate Family Life, Volume 4, Number 3 (spring 2007):350–378.
- 2007. "Catholic Marriage and Feminism," in The Church, Marriage, and the Family, Proceedings of the 27th Annual Fellowship of Catholic Scholars Convention, Kenneth D. Whitehead (South Bend, Indiana: St. Augustine's Press, 2007), Chapter 7: 95–144.
- 2007. "Remarks on Receiving the Cardinal Wright Award," in The Church, Marriage, and the Family, Proceedings of the 27th Annual Fellowship of Catholic Scholars Convention, Kenneth D. Whitehead (South Bend, Indiana: St. Augustine's Press, forthcoming 2007), Chapter 25: 406–408.
- 1997. "Femininity and Chastity," Proceedings of the Eighth National Assembly of the Council of Major Superiors of Women Religious, (1997): pp. 57–92.
- 1997. "Language and the Invitation to Conversion," Language and Faith: Proceedings from the Nineteenth Convention of the Fellowship of Catholic Scholars, 1997, pp. 93–128.
- 1996. "Metaphysics of Form, Matter, and Gender," Lonergan Workshop, Volume 12 (1996), pp. 1–26.
- 1994. co-authored with Sister Mary Kathleen Ronan, RSM, STD, "The Human Person, Kerygma, and Religious Life," Proceedings of the Council of Major Superiors of Women Religious, (1994), pp. 11–39.
- 1994. "Rationality, Gender, and History," American Catholic Philosophical Quarterly, Proceedings of 1994 Annual Conference, 1994, Volume LXVIII, pp. 271–288.
- 1988. "Theories of Sex Identity: Some Proposed Areas of Application" in Proceedings of the XVIIth World Congress of Philosophy, 1988, Vol. V, pp. 54–62.
- 1988. "Women Philosophers before 1300" in the Proceedings of the XVIIth World Congress of Philosophy, 1988, Vol. II, pp. 635–639.
- 1986. "Relations Homme/Femme: Les révolutions aristotélicienne et cartésienne," Égalité et différence des sexes: Cahiers de L'ACFAS 1986 (Actes de Colloque International Sur la Situation de la Femme), Montréal: Université de Montréal, 1986, pp. 325–337.
- 1977. "Who Was Rebekah?," Beyond Androcentrism: New Essays on Women and Religion, Rita Gross, ed., (Montana: Scholars Press, 1977), pp. 183–216.
- 1973. "Good and Evil for Woman," Women and Religion, The American Academy of Religion, 1973 proceedings, Judith Goldenberg and Joan Romero, eds, pp. 104–107.

=== Video Presentations ===
- 2019. "Newman and a Proof for the Integral Complementarity of Woman and Man", St. Anselm Institute, University of Virginia, January 31, 2019. Available at: St. Anselm Institute Videos
- 2017. "The Dignity of Human Gender," McGrath Institute for Church Life, University of Notre Dame. October 24. 2017. Uploaded by McGrathND, Oct 28, 2017 Available at The Dignity of Human Gender: Sr. Prudence Allen, RSM
