= Religious Sisters of Mercy of Alma =

Religious institute

Religious Sisters of Mercy of Alma, Michigan
- Established: September 1, 1973; 52 years ago
- Founder: Mother Catherine McAuley, RSM
- Headquarters: Motherhouse; 1965 Michigan Ave., Alma, Michigan
- Members: 115 (2025)
- Superior General: Mother Mary Christa Nutt, RSM
- Post-nominal initials: RSM
- Affiliations: Roman Catholic
- Website: https://www.almamercy.org/

The Religious Sisters of Mercy of Alma, Michigan is a religious institute of pontifical right, dedicated to the spiritual and corporal works of mercy. It was established in 1973, in response to the renewal called for in the Second Vatican Council. The Institute's Motherhouse is located in Alma, Michigan. It recognizes the Venerable Catherine McAuley as its original foundress.

== History ==
In 1966, four Sisters of Mercy, of the faculty of the Mercy College in Detroit, studied Mercy Spirituality and identified ten constituent elements. In 1970, seven Sisters of Mercy formed an experimental community in Grand Rapids, Michigan, implementing these elements. On September 1, 1973, the group became a distinct Institute of Pontifical Right.

== Description ==
The Sisters profess the vows of poverty, chastity, and obedience, as well as a fourth vow of service. They work predominantly in the apostolates of education and health care. In 2015, the community numbered about 100 members and had houses in several US states, as well as Germany, Australia and Italy.

Sacred Heart Mercy Health Care Center (SHMHCC) is a non-profit Michigan corporation, founded by the Religious Sisters of Mercy of Alma, Michigan.

Sister Mary Prudence Allen R.S.M. was among the 40 theologians and philosophers Pope Francis named to the International Theological Commission on Sept. 23, 2014. She is one of five women, and two Americans, named to the commission that was set up in 1969, to advise the pope and Vatican on doctrinal issues.

== See also ==
- Sisters of Mercy
