= Letter to Women =

Pastoral letter by Pope John Paul II

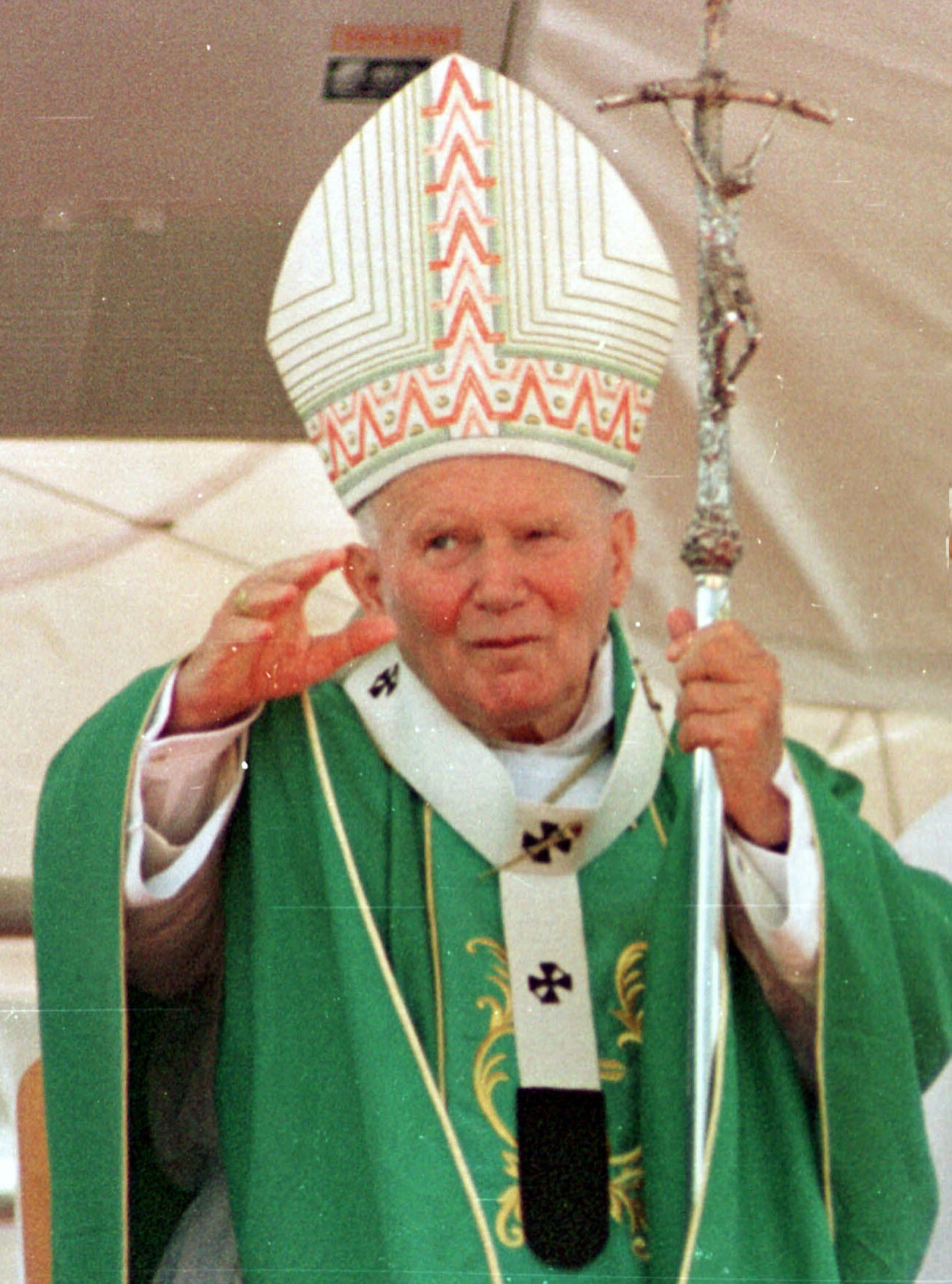
Pope John Paul II

Letter to Women is a pastoral letter written by Pope John Paul II to all women, and deals with the rights and dignity of women, the many challenges that women in the modern era have had to face, and ways in which the cause of woman could be forwarded in the world. Written June 29, 1995, the letter drafted in anticipation of the Fourth World Conference on Women in September 1995, hosted by the United Nations in Beijing. This letter was an affirmation to the continuing thought of Pope John Paul II on the importance of women in the Church, and the special roles in which only they can contribute in the realms of the family, the Church, and the world. In his pontificate which lasted longer than 26 years, he continuously upheld the dignity and honor of women, and this letter was a significant contribution to his corpus of works on the importance of women within the Church.

== Description ==
In the letter the Pope "speaks ‘directly to the hearts and minds’ of each and asks them to reflect with him on themselves and their cultural, social and ecclesial responsibility that flows from their being women.”

The letter begins with Pope John Paul II giving thanks to the United Nations for sponsoring such an important event, and continues by giving thanks to God for the gift of woman, and for each individual woman. He continues the letter by then giving thanks to all women for their various accomplishments and work, and follows with an apology lamenting the fact that members within the Church have not always recognized the importance of women and their contributions throughout history. He also strongly condemns the history of sexual violence against women, and the failure of many societies and cultures which have failed to fully integrate women socially, politically, and economically.

Seeking to effect a change in this condition of women, Pope John Paul II makes an appeal to all states, nations, and institutional organizations to improve and better the situation and condition of work and life for women throughout the world. Pope John Paul II would lend his support to the movements of women in forwarding improvement in their lives, and called for women's equality to be standard throughout the world. The Pope would also raise a concern regarding a trend of society in denigrating motherhood, and of penalizing women who would seek to have children.

== Uni-duality ==
The concept of "uni-duality" in the Letter refers to the fact that God confides to the unity of the two, man and woman, not just the task of procreation, but the very construction of history. This Letter, more than any other writings, emphasises the importance of the contribution of women in professional work and world governance.

[T]here is an urgent need to achieve real equality in every area: equal pay for equal work, protection for working mothers, fairness in career advancements, equality of spouses with regard to family rights and the recognition of everything that is part of the rights and duties of citizens in a democratic State...This is a matter of justice but also of necessity. Women will increasingly play a part in the solution of the serious problems of the future: leisure time, the quality of life, migration, social services, euthanasia, drugs, health care, the ecology, etc. In all these areas a greater presence of women in society will prove most valuable, for it will help to manifest the contradictions present when society is organized solely according to the criteria of efficiency and productivity, and it will force systems to be redesigned in a way which favours the processes of humanization which mark the "civilization of love".

The Pope is careful to note a distinction between women's roles in professional work and world governance as compared to specific ministries,

...[O]ne can also appreciate that the presence of a certain diversity of roles is in no way prejudicial to women, provided that this diversity is not the result of an arbitrary imposition, but is rather an expression of what is specific to being male and female. This issue also has a particular application within the Church. If Christ-by his free and sovereign choice, clearly attested to by the Gospel and by the Church's constant Tradition-entrusted only to men the task of being an "icon" of his countenance as "shepherd" and "bridegroom" of the Church through the exercise of the ministerial priesthood, this in no way detracts from the role of women, or for that matter from the role of the other members of the Church who are not ordained to the sacred ministry, since all share equally in the dignity proper to the "common priesthood" based on Baptism.

== Feminine genius ==
Pope John Paul II upholds the great honor of women as being the only ones who could ever bear life, and continues the themes from his 1988 encyclical, Mulieris Dignitatem, particularly that of the feminine genius This "feminine genius" includes qualities such as that of receptivity, emphasis on the person, empathy, protection of life, and sanctity and modesty, among others. Each of these qualities serves to strengthen and enliven the feminine character, and should serve to be inspirational and uplifting, and should in no way be hidden or repressed. It is precisely the “feminine genius” that the Pope calls on to defend the right and dignity of women today, and sees the feminine genius as the answer to the “culture of death” inherent in society's penchant for abortion, euthanasia and war. Pope John Paul II exalted Mary, as the Mother of God, as a prime example of the feminine genius, and encouraged all men and women to look to her as an inspiration for their own lives.

He ends his letter with the hope that the United Nations conference in Beijing would “...bring out the full truth about women.” He hopes that the conference will emphasize the gift of "the genius of woman" not only in regards to great, accomplished female leaders but the ordinary women who have contributed so much in the spirit of service. He attributes this to the ability of women, more so than men, to be able to acknowledge the human person and to help them regardless of ideology or politics.

== See also ==
- Teachings of Pope John Paul II
- New feminism
- Pro-life feminism
