= John Paul II Center for the New Evangelization =

Church building in Colorado, US

Coordinates: 39.6929°N 104.9497°W

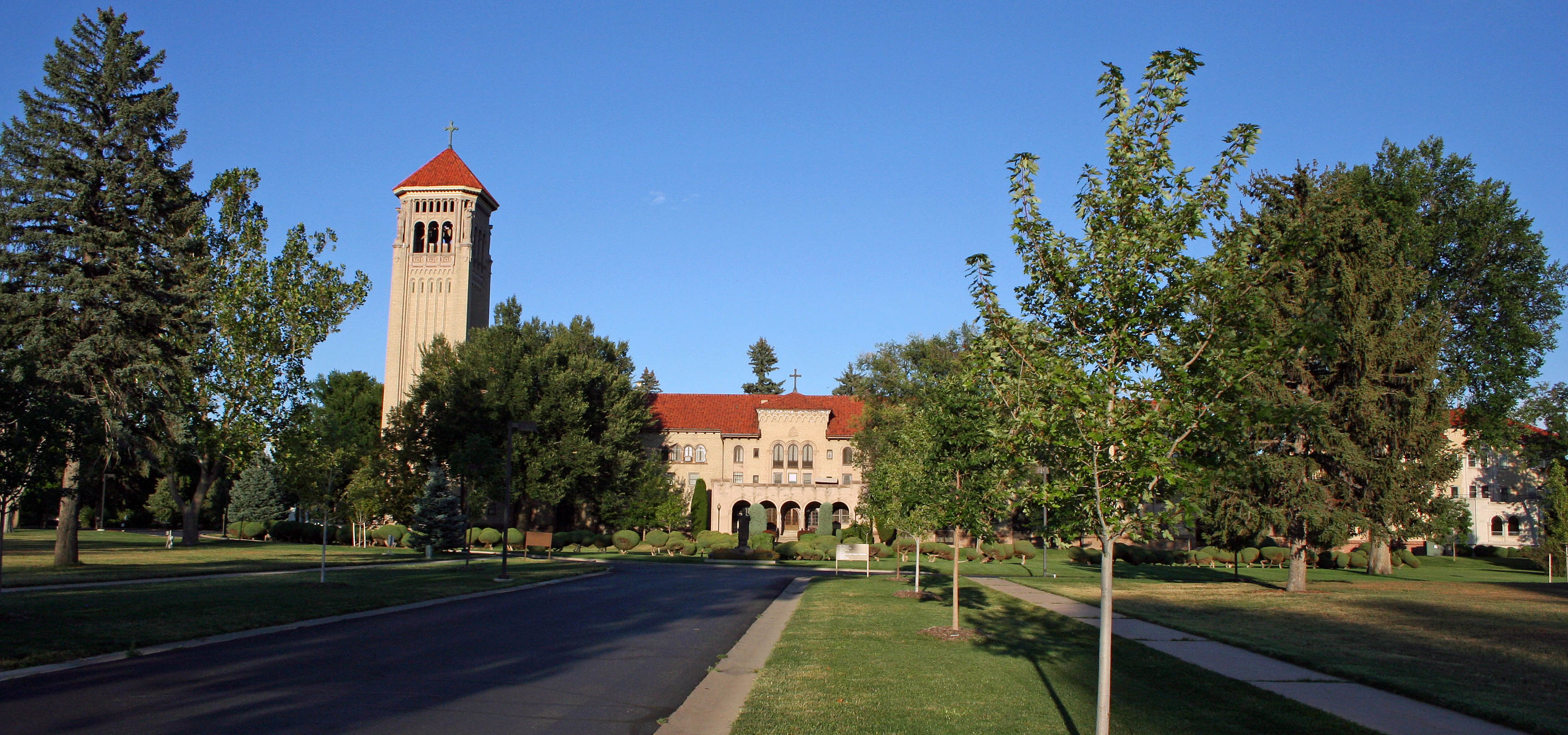
A view of the Center's main building.

The St. John Paul II Center for the New Evangelization is a Roman Catholic Institution in the Roman Catholic Archdiocese of Denver. The St. John Paul II Center for the New Evangelization campus is home to the Saint John Vianney Theological Seminary, Redemptoris Mater (seminary), Catholic Pastoral Center of the Archdiocese of Denver - (Archdiocesan Offices), the residence of the Archbishop of Denver, Cardinal Stafford Library, Religious Sisters of Mercy of Alma convent, Bonfils hall, and a large soccer and baseball/softball field. It has been said that it is “at the heart of the Church in northern Colorado and on the frontlines of the Church’s modern “crusade” for the “New Evangelization.””

The original name of the center was the Saint Thomas Seminary. The name was changed in 1996 following the visit of Pope John Paul II to Denver. The site is listed on the National Register of Historic Places listings in Denver, Colorado.
