= Mulieris dignitatem =

1988 apostolic letter by Pope John Paul II

Mulieris dignitatem Letter of Pope John Paul II
- Signature date: 15 August 1988
- Text: In Latin; In English

Mulieris dignitatem (Ecclesiastical Latin: [muliˈeris diɲiˈtatem]; "the Dignity of a Woman") is an apostolic letter by Pope John Paul II on the dignity of women, published on 15 August 1988, and written in conjunction with the 1987-88 Marian Year.

Mulieris dignitatem defends the equality of women, the vocation to love, the mutual submission of husbands and wives, the on-going impact of Original Sin on male/female relationships, Jesus's modeling of how to treat women, the significance of Jesus's mother for today's Christians, and the nature of the relationship between Christ and His Church including the role of the Eucharist as expressing the total self-gift of Christ and making possible the reciprocal total self-gift of the recipient.

== Description ==
The Pope characterizes the text as a "meditation" on the "dignity of women and their vocation", as found in Scripture. He then goes on to say that the dignity of the human person is rooted theologically in his/her creation in the image and likeness of God and their redemption through the Son, the Eternal Word made flesh. And further that Mary is the most complete expression of this dignity and vocation."

Referencing Clement of Alexandria, (Paed. 1, 4: S. Ch. 70, 128-131) and Augustine of Hippo (Sermo 51, II, 3: PL 38, 334-335) John Paul II says that the Creation account in Genesis 2: 21-24 "provides sufficient bases for recognizing the essential equality of man and woman from the point of view of their humanity." Man and woman were created for a mutual relationship. This relationship was disrupted by sin. "Therefore when we read in the biblical description the words addressed to the woman: "Your desire shall be for your husband, and he shall rule over you" (Gen 3:16), we discover a break and a constant threat precisely in regard to this "unity of the two" which corresponds to the dignity of the image and likeness of God in both of them.". However, "whatever diminishes woman, in essence, also diminishes man, thus both are affected negatively."

It cites the recent Marian year (1987), the Church as bride of Christ, and the role of women in the Bible as the first witnesses to the Resurrection as proof that Christianity values women, men, and all members of the community. It also mentions the importance of traditional roles of women, such as mother, teacher, and daughter in contemporary society.

The document refers to several female saints, including Monica, Macrina, Olga of Kiev, Matilda of Tuscany, Hedwig of Silesia, Jadwiga of Poland, Elizabeth of Hungary, Bridget of Sweden, Joan of Arc, Rose of Lima, Elizabeth Ann Seton, and the Venerable Mary Ward (who is not yet canonized).

The theology of marriage expressed in Mulieris dignitatem goes back to Augustine of Hippo, who gave the classical description of the goods of marriage as fidelity (fides), children (proles), and sacrament (sacramentum).

The letter also defends the doctrine of the all-male priesthood: In calling only men as his Apostles, Christ acted in a completely free and sovereign manner. In doing so, he exercised the same freedom with which, in all his behaviour, he emphasized the dignity and the vocation of women, without conforming to the prevailing customs and to the traditions sanctioned by the legislation of the time. In 1995 John Paul wrote another text on women, a pastoral entitled Letter to Women.
