= Saint John Vianney Seminary (Denver) =

Catholic seminary in Denver

Coordinates: 39°41′34″N 104°56′52″W

Saint John Vianney Theological Seminary
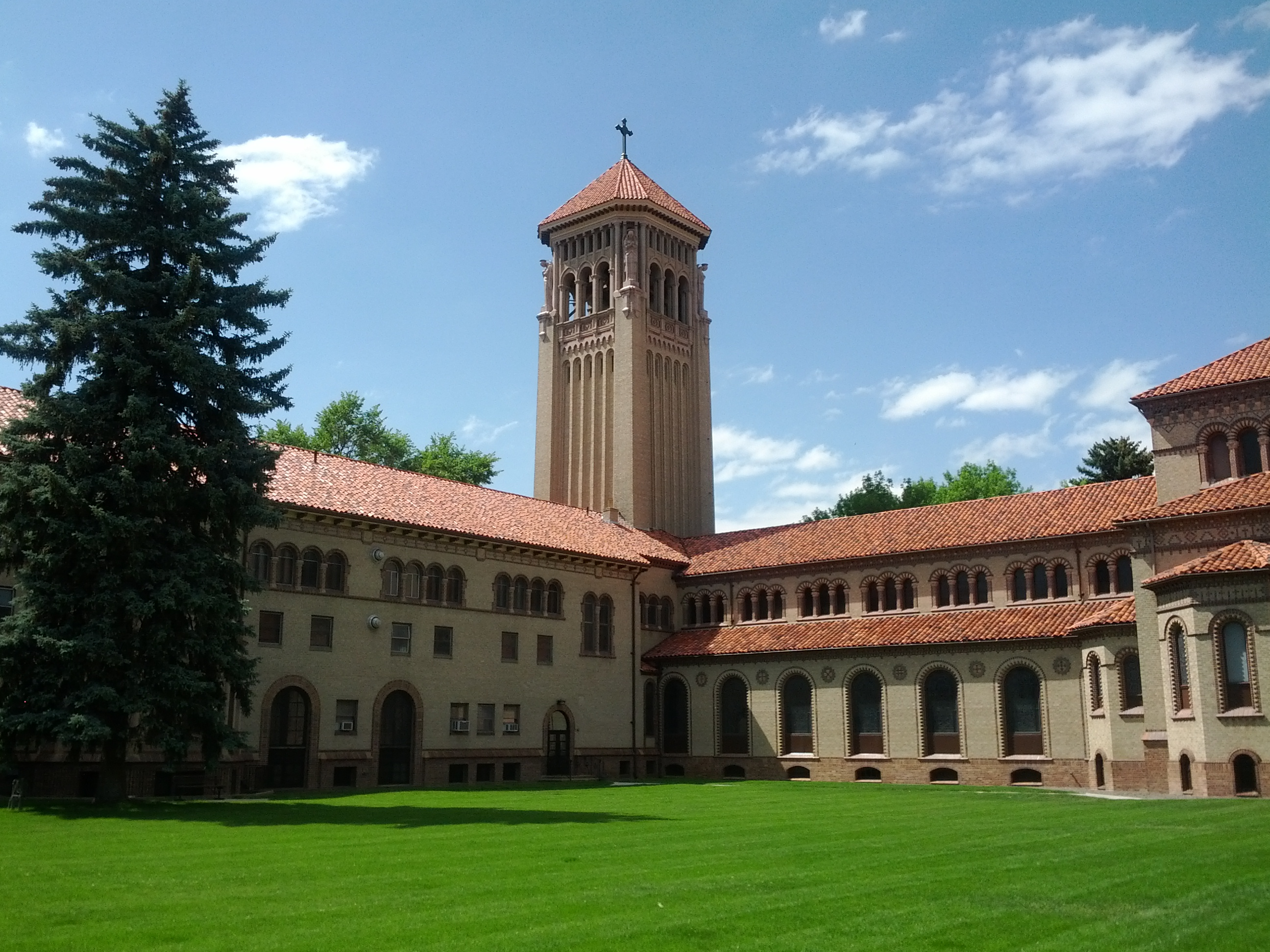
- Main Seminary building (left of tower) and Christ the King Chapel (right of tower)
- Type: All-male seminary; coed lay programs
- Established: 1999
- Affiliations: Catholic Church (Archdiocese of Denver)
- Rector: Very Rev. Daniel Leonard
- Students: 120
- Location: 1300 South Steele Street, Denver, Colorado, United States
- Website: www.sjvdenver.edu

Saint John Vianney Theological Seminary is a Catholic seminary in Denver, Colorado, dedicated to Saint John Vianney, the patron saint of parish priests. It is located at 1300 South Steele Street in the Cory-Merrill neighborhood of Denver, on the campus of the St. John Paul II Center for the New Evangelization. Founded in 1999, St. John Vianney is run by the Archdiocese of Denver.

St. John Vianney offers formation programs for seminarians studying for the priesthood, candidates to become permanent deacons, and lay people interested in learning more about Catholicism.

== History ==
St. John Vianney Theological Seminary was constituted on March 17, 1999. It replaced the former St. Thomas Seminary, which operated from 1907 to the early 1990s. Cardinal James Stafford, archbishop of Denver, purchased the St. Thomas Seminary campus from the Congregation of the Mission in 1995. He renamed it the St. John Paul II Center for the New Evangelization and remodeled a facility there for the archdiocesan chancery.

Archbishop Charles J. Chaput, Stafford's successor. commissioned a feasibility study on establishing a new seminary at the St. John Paul II Center. After consulting with priests and parishioners, he formulated a plan to create the St. John Vianney Theological Seminary. The plans also called for the establishment of:

- The St. Francis School of Theology for Deacons
- The Catechetical School
- The Denver Catholic Biblical School for lay formation

== Seminarian program ==
=== Summary ===
The St. John Vianney program for seminarians studying for the priesthood follows the four pillars listed in Pope John Paul II's Pastores Dabo Vobis: human formation, spiritual formation, pastoral formation and intellectual formation. The seminary has three components in the priestly formation process:

- Spirituality year, a one-year program for prayer, discernment, study and community service
- Pre-theology cycle, a two or three-year program of coursework in philosophy, languages and introductory courses in theology
- Theology cycle, a four-year program of coursework in the theological and pastoral disciplines required for ordination

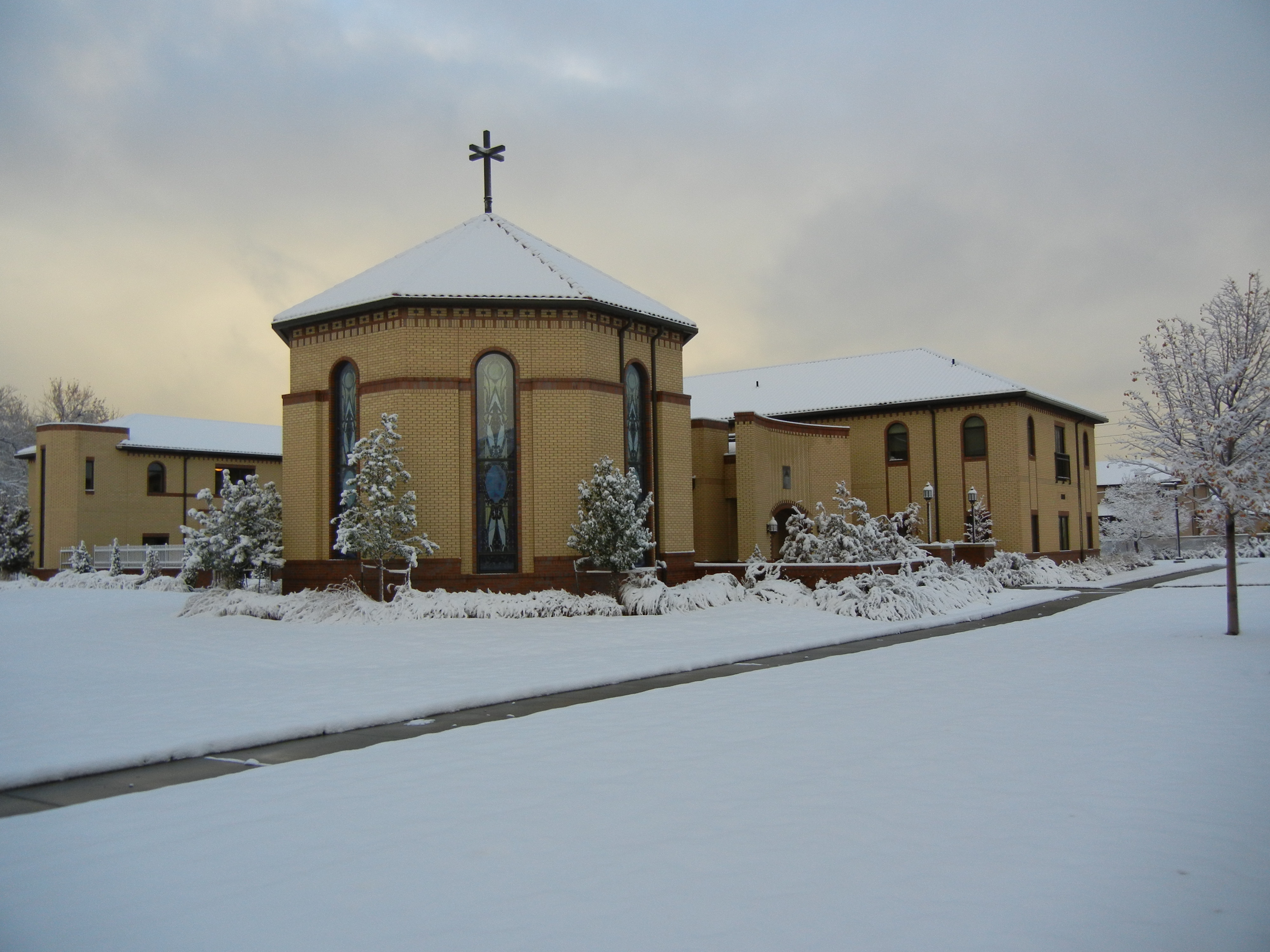
Spirituality Year House at St. John Vianney.

=== Spirituality Year ===
The spirituality year (SY) is a 12-month program of prayer, meditation, limited classroom study, community service and evangelization. It is a prerequisite for the pre-theology cycle. SY is marked by a commitment to prayer; seminarians attend three retreats, including a 30-day silent Ignatian retreat. They give up phones, television, computers, and popular media. The seminarians live in a separate community on the seminary grounds and pray, study, work and take recreation together. The men also spend two hours a day studying sacred scripture, catechism, and spiritual classics in the classroom.

At the end of the SY, the seminarians undertake apostolic assignments outside the seminary. These assignments include teaching young people, visiting the elderly, and ministering to the sick. In January of their spirituality year, the seminarians are sent out in pairs for one month to live with the poor, serve them and teach them about Catholicism.

=== Pre-theology cycle ===
The pre-theology cycle at St. John Vianney is a two- or three-year set of courses that cover philosophy, introductory theology, and languages. It is a prerequisite for the theology cycle. The seminarian's diocese can choose between degree and non-degree programs in philosophy to meet the entrance requirements for the theology cycle. The study of philosophy is central to the pre-theology program. St. John Vianney offers three undergraduate philosophy programs:

- Standard program in pre-theology
- Bachelor of Philosophy (B.Phil.) degree
- Bachelor of Arts (B.A.) degree with a philosophy major

=== Theology cycle ===
The Theology Cycle at St. John Vianney is a four-year program of study in theological and pastoral disciplines which meet the requirements for priestly formation specified by the United States Conference of Catholic Bishops (USCCB). Each seminarian is enrolled in a graduate level program that enables him to earn both a Bachelor of Sacred Theology degree (S.T.B.) and a Master of Divinity degree (M.Div.) prior to ordination.

== Deacon program ==
St Francis School of Theology for Deacons, (SFSTD), is a division of St John Vianney Seminary. The SFSTD trains permanent deacons for the Archdiocese of Denver utilizing the same professors as the seminary. The men who are ordained to Holy Orders provide service of Liturgy, Word, and Sacrament to the Church of Northern Colorado. Admission to SFSTD is limited to men under the age of 60.

== Lay person program ==
The Catechetical School and the Denver Catholic Biblical School are divisions of St. John Vianney Seminary for laypeople.

- The Catechetical School offers small group study, independent study, personal application, and lectures.
- The Denver Catholic Biblical School offers lectures, small-group discussions and weekly coursework on the Bible. The school holds prayer days and retreats, trips to Palestine, Israel, Greece, and Rome, and continuing education for its graduates.

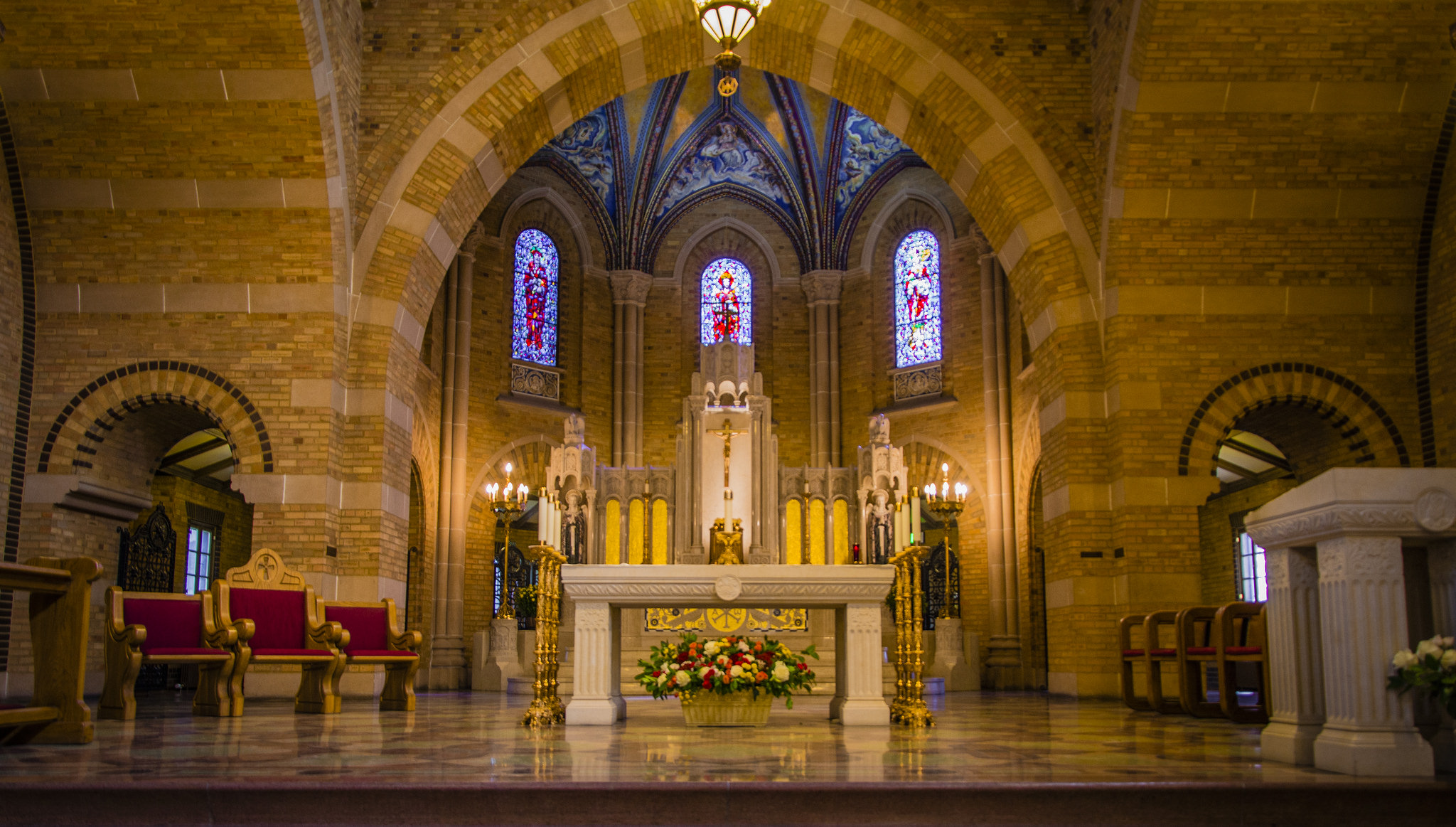
Christ the King Chapel located at St. John Vianney Theological Seminary

== Accreditation & Affiliations ==
St. John Vianney is accredited by the Association of Theological Schools and is affiliated with the Pontifical University of Saint Thomas Aquinas in Rome and Regis University in Denver.

== Administration ==
Previous rectors of St. John Vianney include former Denver Archbishop Samuel J. Aquila, Msgr. Michael Glenn, Rev. Scott Traynor. As of 2018. the rector was Fr. Daniel Leonard.

== Students ==
St. John Vianney serves 15 dioceses in the Western United States and two international dioceses. As of 2014, 136 men from these dioceses were attending the seminary to prepare for the priesthood.
