= List of synagogues in Wisconsin =

This is a list of Wisconsin synagogues.

| Name | City | Founded | Status | Denomination | Notes |
|---|---|---|---|---|---|
| Baith Israel | Antigo | 1915 | defunct | unknown | Concluded services by 1932. Sold to Odd Fellows Club in 1947. |
| Moses Montefiore Synagogue | Appleton | 1903 | active | Conservative – Egalitarian | Originally Orthodox until became USCJ member in May 1965. |
| Temple Zion | Appleton | 1883 | defunct | Reform | Building restored by Wahl Organbuilders. Mayer Samuel Weiss—father of Harry Houdini—was rabbi early on. |
| B'nai Israel Synagogue | Ashland | | defunct | unknown | Destroyed. Congregation established 1888, bought an existing church building in 1897, ceased operation and sold building in 1951, structure demolished in 1988. |
| Congregation B'nai Abraham | Beloit | 1907 | active | Reform | Originally Orthodox until became URJ member. |
| Temple Sholom | Eau Claire | 1960 | active | Conservative | Became USCJ member in 1969. Services initially in rented spaces before purchasing a defunct Wesleyan Methodist Church. |
| Kehillath Jacob Synagogue | Fond du Lac | 1923 | defunct | Orthodox | Services initially held in designated homes. |
| Temple Beth Israel | Fond du Lac | 1959 | active | Conservative | Open occasionally. |
| Congregation Sinai | Milwaukee | 1955 | active | Reform | |
| Anshe Sfard Kehillat Torah | Glendale | 1889 | active | Orthodox – Modern | Merger of Congregation Anshe Sfard and Kehillat Torah Synagogues. |
| Ohr HaTorah – Shul & Torah Center | Glendale | | active | Orthodox | |
| Congregation Cnesses Israel | Green Bay | 1898 | active | Conservative | USCJ member. Synagogue built by 1903. |
| Sharey Zedek | Hurley | 1895 | defunct | unknown | Converted to apartments by 1940. |
| Beth Hillel Temple | Kenosha | 1925 | active | Reform | URJ member. Synagogue built in 1927. |
| Chabad of Kenosha/Congregation Bnai Zedek Chabad | Kenosha | 1910 | active | Orthodox – Chabad Lubavitch | Originally Congregation Bnai Zedek. |
| Congregation Anche Chesed | La Crosse | 1873 or 1878 | defunct | Reform | Services previously held in Masonic Lodge Hall. Created by the Hebrew Benevolent Society. |
| Congregation Sons of Abraham | La Crosse | 1905 | active | Reform | URJ member. New synagogue built by 1948. |
| Beth Israel Center | Madison | 1944 or 1948 | active | Conservative –Egalitarian | Combined congregations Beth Jacob (Conservative), Agudas Achim and Adas Jeshurun (both Orthodox). |
| Temple Beth El | Madison | 1939 | active | Reform | Rabbi Manfred Swarsensky was first hired rabbi. |
| Chabad Madison | Madison | | active | Orthodox – Chabad Lubavitch | |
| Shaarei Shamayim Congregation | Madison | 1989 | active | Reconstructionist | Means "Gates of Heaven" in Hebrew. Met at Prairie Unitarian Universalist Society until 2008. Moved to First Unitarian Society. |
| Gates of Heaven Synagogue | Madison | 1863 | defunct | Reform | Building is now publicly available for rental. High Holiday services are held there annually and led by Hannah Rosenthal. |
| Anshe Poale Zedek | Manitowoc | 1900 | defunct | Orthodox | Officially built in 1954. Shut down in 2016. |
| Sons of Jacob Synagogue | Marinette | | defunct | unknown | One of three synagogues in Marinette in 1903 |
| Congregation Agudas Achim Chabad | Mequon | 1986 or 1988 | active | Orthodox – Chabad Lubavitch | |
| Anshai Lebowitz | Mequon | 1908 | active | Orthodox | Moved 1998. |
| Beth El Ner Tamid | Glendale | 1923 | merged | Conservative | Means "House of God—Eternal Light" in Hebrew. Merged with Congregation Beth Israel by 2012. |
| Congregation Beth Israel Ner Tamid | Glendale | 2012 | active | Conservative – Egalitarian | Started as Congregation B'ne Jacob. Merger of Beth El Ner Tamid and Beth Israel. USCJ member. |
| Congregation Shir Hadash | Milwaukee | 1989 | active | Reconstructionist | JRF member. |
| Congregation Beth Jehudah | Milwaukee | 1939 | active | Orthodox | Founded by Rabbi Jacob Twerski. |
| Congregation Bais Dovid | Milwaukee | late 1990s | active | Orthodox | |
| Congregation Beth Israel | Milwaukee | 1901 | merged | Conservative | USCJ member. |
| Congregation Shalom | Milwaukee | 1951 | active | Reform | |
| Jewish REACH Russian Educational and Aid Center | Milwaukee | | active | Orthodox – Chabad Lubavitch | Holds sabbath and holiday services. |
| Lake Park Synagogue | Milwaukee | 1982–83 | active | Orthodox – Modern | OU member. |
| The Shul Bayside | Milwaukee | | active | Orthodox – Chabad Lubavitch | |
| The Shul East | Milwaukee | | active | Orthodox – Chabad Lubavitch | |
| Temple Menorah | Milwaukee | 1964 | active | Conservative | |
| Temple B'nai Israel | Oshkosh | 1895 | active | Reform | First synagogue built 1902. New one built 1948. Originally Orthodox before became URJ member by 1949. |
| Beth Israel Sinai | Racine | 1920s | active | Non-affiliated | Merger of Sinai Congregation and Beth Israel Congregation. Traditional egalitarian services. |
| Congregation Emanu-El B'ne Jeshurun | River Hills | 1927 | active | Reform | Merger of B'ne Jeshurun and Congregation Emanu-El. |
| Adas Israel | Sheboygan | | defunct | Orthodox | Called "The White Shul." Synagogue built 1910. Converted to church. |
| Ahavas Sholem | Sheboygan | | defunct | Orthodox | Called "The Brick Shul." Originally St. Mary Magdalene, Sheboygan's first Catholic church built before 1871. Became Sheboygan's first synagogue 1903. Destroyed in 1975. |
| Beth El Congregation | Sheboygan | | active | Conservative | Sheboygan's only non-Orthodox synagogue. Built 1944 |
| Ohel Mosche | Sheboygan | | defunct | Orthodox | Called "The Holman Shul." Synagogue built 1918. Destroyed. |
| Temple Beth Israel | Stevens Point | 1905 | defunct | Conservative | Disbanded 1986. Currently a Portage County Historical Society Museum. Recognized on National Register of Historic Places |
| Agudas Achim | Superior | | defunct | Orthodox | Called the "Litvische Shul." Eventually replaced by Temple Beth El in 1964. |
| Superior Hebrew Congregation | Superior | | defunct | Conservative | Called the "Russische Shul." |
| Temple Beth El | Superior | | defunct | unknown | Founded by former members of Agudas Achim synagogue. |
| Congregation Emanu-El of Waukesha | Waukesha | 1939 | active | Reform | Means "God is with us" in Hebrew. |
| Beth Israel | Wausau | 1917 | defunct | Orthodox – Modern | Disbanded 1950. |
| Mount Sinai Congregation | Wausau | 1914 | active | Reform | Became Conservative in 1944 before back to Reform in 1960s. New synagogue built 1991. |

== See also ==
- List of Jewish communities in North America
- List of Yeshivas and Midrashas in Israel
