= Täubler =

Täubler is a German surname. Notable people with the surname include:

- Eugen Täubler (1879–1953), German historian
- Selma Stern-Täubler (1890–1981), German historian
