= Hermann Ostfeld =

German rabbi (1912–1996)

Hermann Ostfeld (February 10, 1912 – 1996) was a German rabbi, criminologist, psychotherapist and judicial official in Israel. In 1951, he changed his name to Zvi Hermon.

== Biography ==
Ostfeld was born on February 10, 1912, Hamborn, to Jewish family from Bukovina. After graduating high school in 1930 he studied at the Hochschule für die Wissenschaft des Judentums, University of Berlin, and in parallel at the University of Würzburg. There, he received his doctorate in 1933, with his thesis Die Haltung der Reichstagsfraktion der Fortschrittlichen Volkspartei zu den Annexions- und Friedensfragen in den Jahren 1914-1918. In 1935, he received the rabbinate diploma from the university, and shortly thereafter, on September 15, 1935, at the age of 23, he took office as rabbi of the Jewish community of Göttingen and was, until today (as of 2021), the last rabbi in Göttingen. A short time later, he was also given the office of district rabbi for southern Lower Saxony and thus the care for the Jewish communities in Einbeck, Moringen, Hannoversch Münden, Duderstadt, Bovenden, Bremke, Adelebsen, Geismar and Dransfeld.

From January 1938, Hermann Ostfeld stayed in Palestine for a few weeks. After his return, it was clear to him that he would be active in research at the University of Jerusalem in the future. The chairman of the Jewish community of Göttingen, Max Raphael Hahn, and his brother Nathan Hahn gave him 5,000 ℛ︁ℳ︁ for his new life in Palestine. After 1945, he paid the money back to the Hahn children. A few days before the destruction of the Göttingen synagogue on the night of the pogrom, Ostfeld emigrated to Palestine in October 1938 and took the Hebrewized name Zvi Hermon there in 1951.

In Palestine (Israel since 1948), he worked as a research assistant (research fellow with Professor Ben-Zion Dinur) at the Hebrew University of Jerusalem from 1938 to 1941 and studied social welfare from 1939 to 1942. In 1940, Ostfeld passed the teacher's exam and began a teaching career. Psychoanalytic training followed from 1948 to 1952. From 1942 to 1950, Ostfeld was head of the Social Welfare Department at the Haifa Ministry of Social Affairs. In 1952, he became director of the Commissioner of Prisons in Israel and was dismissed after a prisoner uprising at Shatta Prison. From 1958 to March 1966, Hermon was the scientific director of the Prison Administration in Israel.

Hermon's academic career began in 1960 as a lecturer in penology at the universities of Jerusalem and Tel Aviv. From 1965 to 1968, he was a lecturer in societal pathology in Tel Aviv, 1968 as a visiting lecturer at the Institute of Criminology at the University of Cologne (Germany), 1968/69 at McGill University in Montreal, Canada, and 1969–1973 professor of criminology in Carbondale, Illinois.

As "departmental editor" of criminology and author of corresponding articles, Zvi Hermon contributed to the Encyclopaedia Judaica.

Ostfeld / Hermon is considered the reformer of the prison system in Israel. The Israeli reform penitentiary Hermon is named after him.

Ostfield was born in 1996, aged 83 or 84, in Tel Aviv.

== Göttingen period ==
On November 17, 1988, on the occasion of the 50th anniversary of the pogrom night of 1938, Zvi Hermon took part as a guest in a panel discussion organized by the city of Göttingen in the Old City Hall there.

In 1990, Hermon's memoirs were published in German by a Göttingen publishing house. In it, he devoted just under 80 pages to his time in Göttingen and described his tasks as a "rabbi in a threatened, frightened Jewish community that fears for its life, for its children, for its future"; as a Zionist, he had been convinced "that emigration and participation in the building of the country is the best way to save the threatened Jewish people," so that he promoted emigration in his sermons and other public appearances.

In 2007, Zvi Hermann's son gave the Göttingen sermon manuscripts from his father's estate to the Göttingen City Archives.

== Publications ==
- Die Haltung der Reichstagsfraktion der Fortschrittlichen Volkspartei zu den Annexions- und Friedensfragen in den Jahren 1914–1918, Kallmünz 1934 (= Dissertation Würzburg 1933).
- Ansprache 9 November 1988 in Duisburg zur 50. Wiederkehr der Geschehnisse der sogenannten "Reichskristallnacht", in: Duisburger Journal, Jg. 13 (1989), Nr. 11, S. 13 ff.
- Hermon, Zvi (1990). Vom Seelsorger zum Kriminologen : Rabbiner in Göttingen, Reformer des Gefängniswesens und Psychotherapeut in Israel : ein Lebensbericht. Göttingen: Verlag O. Schwartz. ISBN 3-509-01520-7. OCLC 23693985.

== Literature ==
- Uta Schäfer-Richter, Jörg Klein: Die jüdischen Bürger im Kreis Göttingen, 1933–1945. Ein Gedenkbuch. Wallstein, Göttingen 1992. (Digitalisat auf google.books.de, retrieved 16 September 2021)
- Peter Aufgebauer: Lebensbedingungen des letzten Göttinger Rabbiners und seiner Gemeinde. Die Erinnerungen von Zvi Hermon, in: R. Sabelleck (Hrsg.): Juden in Südniedersachsen. Geschichte, Lebensverhältnisse, Denkmäler (= Schriftenreihe des Landschaftsverbandes Südniedersachsen 2), Hannover 1994, S. 171 bis 177.
- Biographisches Handbuch der Rabbiner. Hrsg. Michael Brocke, Julius Carlebach, Teil 2, Band 1, München 2009, S. 472 f.
