= Louise Herschman Mannheimer =

American poet

- Born: Louise Herschman; 3 September 1845; Prague, Bohemia
- Died: December 17, 1920 (aged 75); New York City, U.S.
- Education: St. Teine School; Normal School, Prague; University of Cincinnati
- Occupations: author, school founder, inventor
- Spouse: Sigmund Mannheimer (m. 1869)
- Writing career
- Genres: poetry, juvenile literature

Louise Herschman Mannheimer (3 September 1845 – December 17, 1920) was a Czech-American Jewish author, poet, school founder, and inventor. Mannheimer was the founder of the Cincinnati Jewish Industrial School for Boys. She held patents for several devices. She was the inventor of the "Pureairin" Patent Ventilator.

== Biography ==
Louise Herschman was born at Prague, Bohemia, 3 September 1845. (Note: Coyle gives date of birth as September 3, 1844.) Her parents were Joseph Herschman and Katherine Urbach.

Herschman Mannheimer was educated at St. Teine School, privately, and at Normal School, Prague, and University of Cincinnati.

In 1866, she went with her parents to New York City, and three years later, married Sigmund Mannheimer (1835-1909). As the wife of Professor Mannheimer, she strongly seconded his teaching and communal work, both in Rochester, New York and in Cincinnati, Ohio, but made time for literary labors.

She wrote poems, articles, and reviews for German and English periodicals. She was the author of, How Joe Learned to Darn Stockings, and other juvenile stories. Zimmermann's Deutscli in Amerika (Chicago, 1894) contains some of her poems and a short biographical notice. Among her productions in English are "The Storm," a translation of one of Judah Halevi's poems, and "The Harvest," a prize poem (printed in The American Jews' Annual, Cincinnati, 1897). In 1895, she published under the title of "The Jewish Woman" a translation of Nahida Remy's "Das Ji'idische Weib" ("The Jewish Woman") (second edition, 1897). She was the author of "The Maiden's Song".

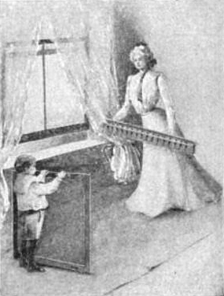
"Pureairin" Patent Ventilator

Herschman Mannheimer worked as a director of a private school, in Prague; teacher of a Sabbath School, Congregation Berith Kodesh, in Rochester; and teacher, Mrs. Leopold Weil's School, New York City. She was the inventor of the Pureairin Patent Ventilator; and founder and president, Boys' Industrial School, Cincinnati. She served as president of the German Women's Club, Rochester; was a contralto at the Temple Ahawath Chesed, New York; and Sabbath School teacher, at Temple Shaare Emeth, St. Louis, Missouri.

She was a speaker at the 1893 World's Columbian Exposition Congress of History and Congress of Religions, in Chicago; and for Mothers' Meetings, in Cincinnati. She was a featured speaker at the Jewish Women’s Congress (1893) on the topic of "Jewish Women of Biblical and Mediaeval Times".

Herschman Mannheimer and her husband lived in Baltimore, New York City, St. Louis, and Rochester before settling in Cincinnati where he taught at the Hebrew Union College. They had two sons, Eugene and Leo, who both became rabbis, and two daughters, the dramatist and elocutionist Jennie Mannheimer (Jane Manner), and the elocutionist Edna B. Mannheimer (Edna B. Manner). Mannheimer died in New York, December 17, 1920.
