= Max Schloessinger =

Max Schloessinger (September 4, 1877 – May 9, 1944) was a German Jewish scholar who worked in America, Germany, the Netherlands, and Mandatory Palestine.

== Life ==
Schloessinger was born on September 4, 1877, in Heidelberg, Germany, the son of Jacob Schloessinger and Brunette Oppenheimer.

Schloessinger attended the Heidelberg public school and gymnasium. He then went to the Heidelberg University, the University of Vienna, the University of Berlin (graduating from there with a Ph.D. in 1901), the Israelitisch-Theologische Lehranstalt in Vienna, the Veitel-Heine-Ephraim'sche Lehranstalt, and the Lehranstalt für die Wissenschaft des Judenthums in Berlin (where he was ordained a rabbi in 1903). In 1903, he went to America and joined the editorial staff of The Jewish Encyclopedia in New York City.

In 1904, Schloessinger resigned as office editor of The Jewish Encyclopedia to join Hebrew Union College in Cincinnati, Ohio, as its Professor of Biblical Exegesis and Librarian. He, Max Margolis, and Henry Malter all resigned from the College in 1907 due to their support for Zionism. Schloessinger returned to Germany afterwards and began a successful import-export business. He then moved to the Netherlands shortly after the outbreak of World War I for business reasons. Active in the Dutch Zionist movement, he served as director of the Jewish National Fund. He resided in The Hague.

Schloessinger immigrated to Mandatory Palestine in 1930. He was friends with Hebrew University president Judah Leon Magnes since they were students at the University of Berlin and was involved with Hebrew University since it was founded in 1925. He became a member of the University's Board of Governors in 1925 and the Executive Council in 1935, and from 1930 to 1935 he was acting chancellor. He retired in 1939 and moved to the United States, settling in New York City.

In 1910, Schloessinger married Dr. Miriam C. Schaar, chief of the Bureau of School Hygiene in Cincinnati. They had a daughter, Hadassah.

Schloessinger died at Mount Sinai Hospital on May 9, 1944. He was buried in Westchester Hills Cemetery.
