= Rini van Woerden =

German-born Dutch footballer

Personal information
- Full name: Rini van Woerden
- Date of birth: 26 March 1934
- Place of birth: Hamborn, Germany
- Date of death: 18 July 2004 (aged 70)
- Position: Midfielder

Youth career
- Feyenoord

Senior career*
Years	Team	Apps	(Gls)
1952–1962	Feyenoord	150	(17)
1962–1963	DWS		
1963–1966	Xerxes		
- * Club domestic league appearances and goals

Rini van Woerden (26 March 1934 – 18 July 2004) was a Dutch footballer who was active as a midfielder. Van Woerden made his debut at Feyenoord and also played for DWS and Xerxes.

== Honours ==
- 1960-61 : Eredivisie winner with Feyenoord
- 1962-63 : Eerste Divisie winner with DWS
- 1964-65 : Promotion to Eerste Divisie with Xerxes
- 1965-66 : Promotion to Eredivisie with Xerxes

== See also ==
- Football in Netherlands
- List of football clubs in the Netherlands
