= Klau Library =

Library in Cincinnati, OH

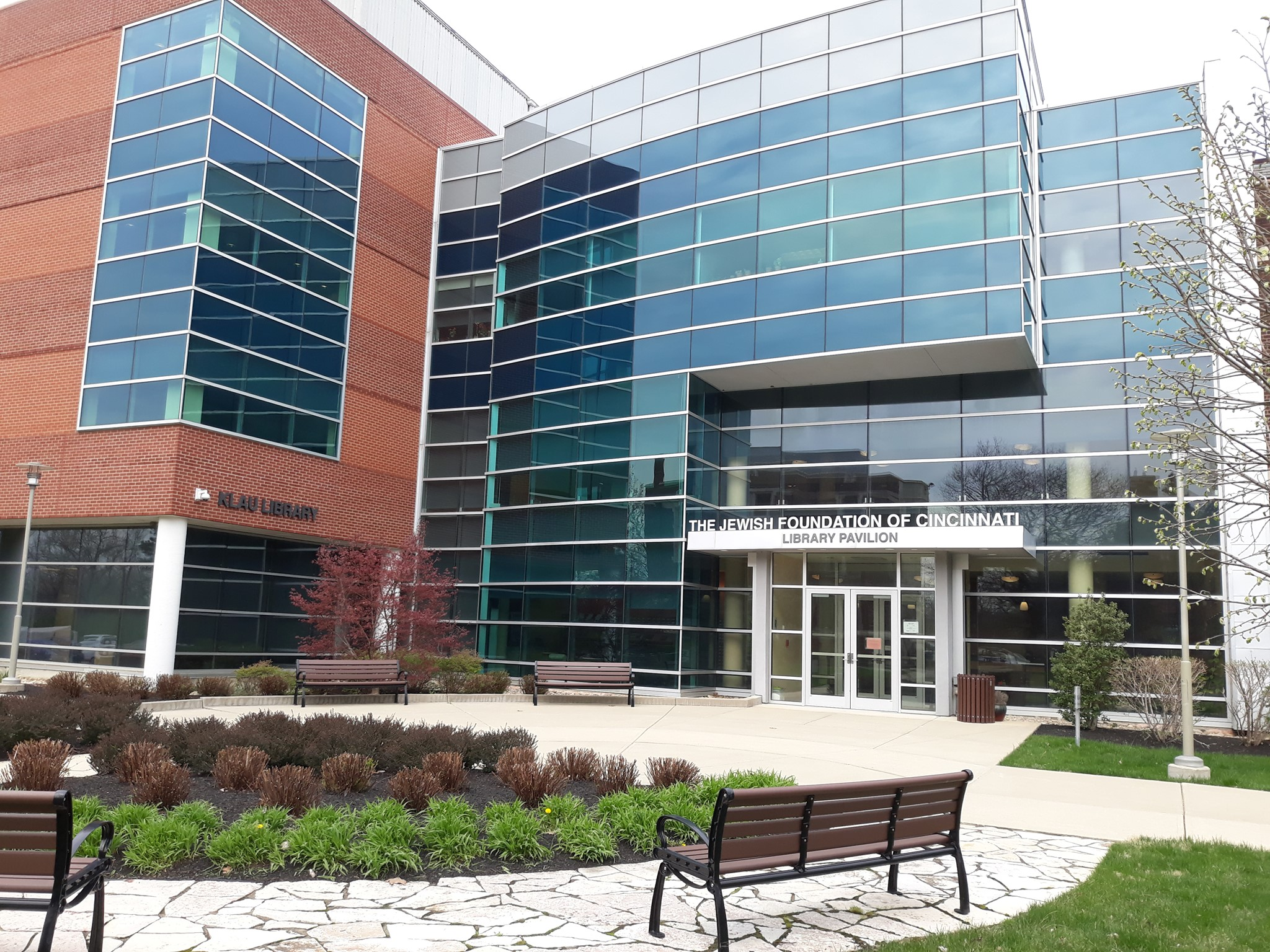
- 39.1386°N 84.5214°W
- Location: 3101 Clifton Avenue, Cincinnati, Ohio, 45220, United States
- Type: Research library
- Scope: Judaism, Hebraica, biblical studies
- Established: 1875
- Branch of: Hebrew Union College-Jewish Institute of Religion Library System
- Branches: 4

Collection
- Size: 600,000

Other information
- Website: https://huc.edu/libraries/cincinnati/

Klau Library (Cincinnati) is a Jewish research library on the Cincinnati campus of Hebrew Union College-Jewish Institute of Religion. It is the oldest and largest of the College-Institute's libraries.

== History ==
The library was founded in 1875 alongside Hebrew Union College by the school's founder, Isaac Mayer Wise. It was known as the Hebrew Union College Library until 1961, when it was renamed in honor of Board of Governors member David Klau.

The library began as a collection of textbooks locked in a chest and managed by the janitor of the first Hebrew Union College building in downtown Cincinnati. This collection numbered 103 in 1875. Eventually, a faculty member was assigned as "librarian." In 1878, the Union of American Hebrew Congregations voted to fund book acquisition for the library, and the collection began to grow. The purchase of books was supplemented by donations, like the private library of Rabbi Samuel Adler, which was given to the library upon his death in 1891.

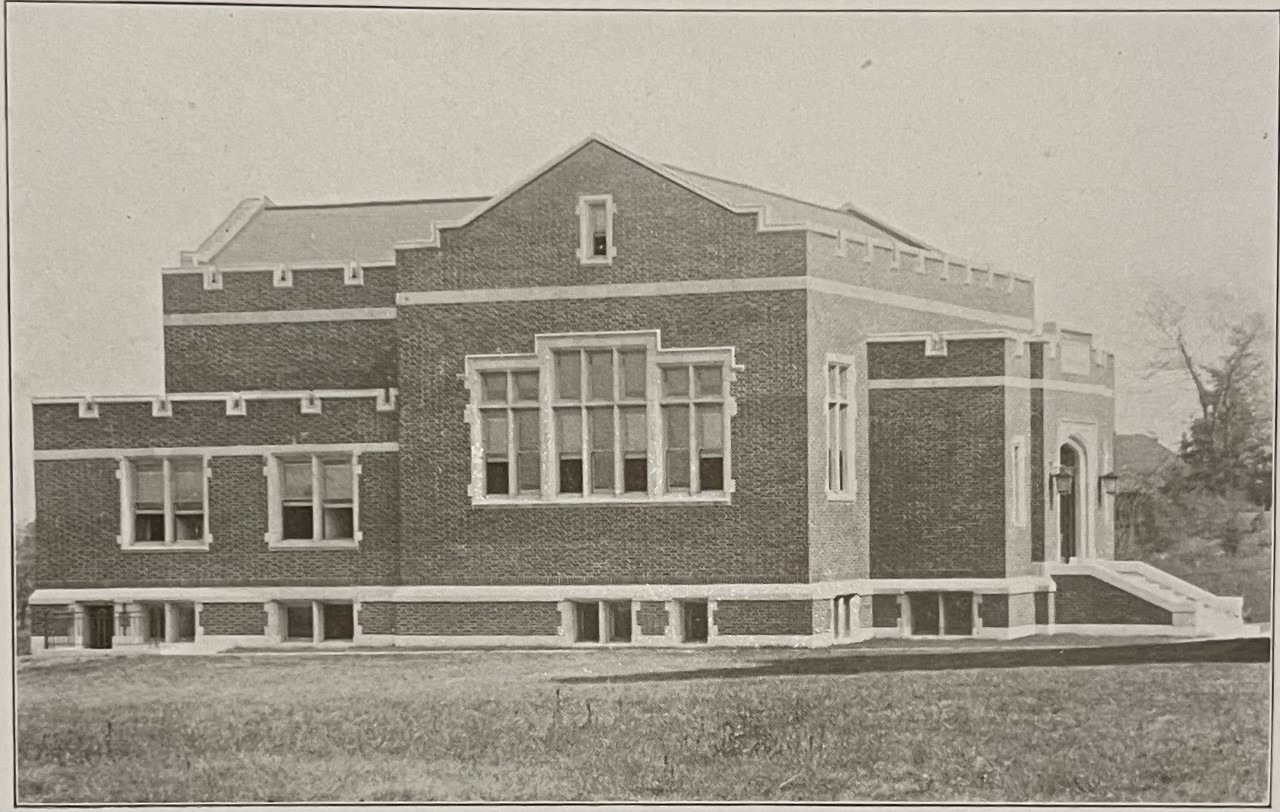
The Bernheim Library Building, the first free-standing building for the Hebrew Union College Library (1913)

When the College moved to Clifton in 1912, the Bernheim Library Building was built, named for Isaac W. Bernheim of Louisville, Kentucky. This building now houses The Jacob Rader Marcus Center of the American Jewish Archives.

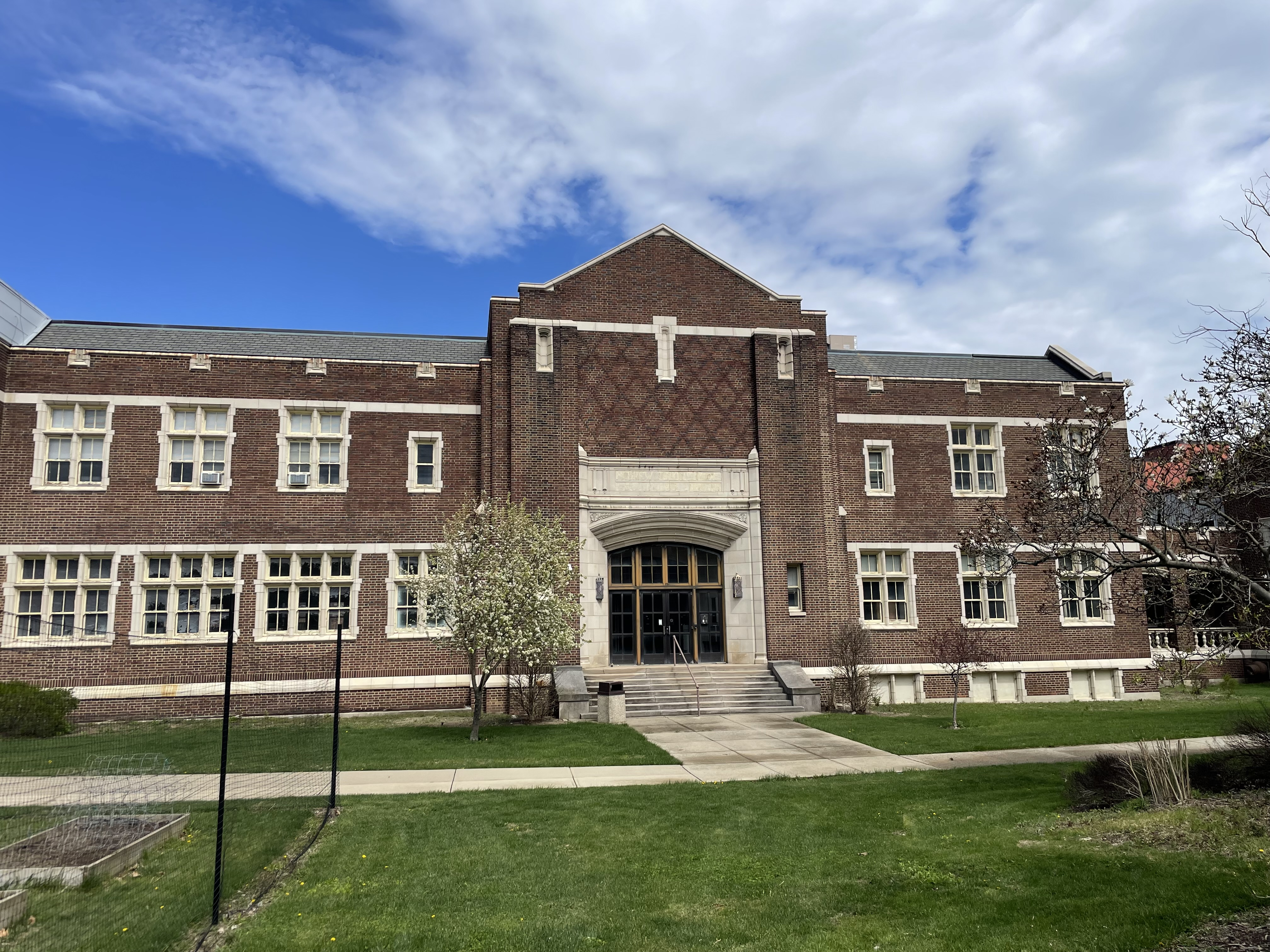
The Hebrew Union College Library's second building (2023)

Under the leadership of Adolph S. Oko, the library quickly outgrew this building. In 1925, after Oko returned from Europe with the library and museum collection of S. Kirschstein of Berlin, the College began planning the library's next building.

The building was dedicated on May 31, 1931. The new building became home to the library, and the Bernheim Building housed the Hebrew Union College Museum (now the Cincinnati Skirball Museum, which has since moved across the campus to Mayerson Hall, and was replaced by The Jacob Rader Marcus Center of the American Jewish Archives ).

In 1961, the expanding library moved into its current building, dedicated as the Klau Library on June 3, 1961. The Dalsheimer Rare Book Building was also built to house the rarest and most valuable materials in the collection. The previous library building was converted to an administrative building for the campus.

The library was on the cutting edge of emerging technology in the late 20th century. In 1983, the Apple II+ computer enabled librarians to catalogue bilingually, in Hebrew and English, becoming the first library in the United States to do so. In 1999, the library began publishing digitized manuscripts and rare print books online, making these books available to the world for the first time.

In the 2000s, the building was renovated to accommodate the collection and make room for growth. On November 1, 2009, the renovated Klau Library was dedicated, along with The Jewish Foundation of Cincinnati Library Pavilion, the library's new atrium. The Dalsheimer Rare Book Building was destroyed, and its collections were moved to the David Ellenson Rare Book Room (named for then-president of HUC-JIR) inside the main library.

The current building has four floors of open stacks, with Reference, Reserves, Circulation, and Technical Services on the main level. There are also five rotating exhibit cases.

== Collection ==
The library holds over 600,000 printed books and thousands of manuscript codices and leaves. The library also offers periodicals, microfilm reels, and sound recordings. The majority of the library's print collection is available in public stacks, and many of the old and rare books are available for use upon request. As a Jewish research library, the collection caters to Biblical and Judaic studies, as well as Yiddish and Modern Hebrew literature.

== David Ellenson Rare Book Room ==
The library's rare book room contains over 14,000 books and over 3,000 manuscript codices and leaves. Included in the collection are around 70 Hebrew incunabula and around 73 non-Hebrew incunabula.

=== Manuscript Music Collection ===
The library holds the musical and liturgical collection of 19th century European scholar and cantor Eduard Birnbaum. The collection contains sheet music, rare book, and other related archival material from the 18th and 19th centuries. Among these are more than 7000 individually cataloged works. It also contains a full liturgical year of handwritten music from his mid-nineteenth century European Ashkenazi Jewish community. Digitization of the collection is in progress.

The library also holds the collection of Jacques Offenbach. Some of these items are held in Cincinnati, but the majority are held in the Klau Library (New York), where the Debbie Friedman School of Sacred Music is located.

=== Kaifeng Manuscripts ===
The library contains a collection of manuscripts from the Jewish community in Kaifeng, China. The collection contains manuscripts, Torah scrolls, haggadot, and a Mandarin/Hebrew siddur. The Klau Library holds and has digitized 59 of the community's 64 known manuscripts (apart from Torah scrolls).

=== Lucille Klau Carothers American Jewish Periodical Center ===
The library began collecting American Jewish periodicals in the early 1900s. This collection of newspapers, magazines, and journals became known as the American Jewish Periodical Center, and in 2009, was renamed in honor of Lucille Klau Carothers, widow of the library's eponymous patron, David Klau. The AJPC catalogue is available in a designated place on the library's website.

== Personnel ==
=== Notable personnel ===
- Jordan Finkin: Current Rare Book and Manuscript Librarian and Deputy Director of HUC-JIR Libraries; Yiddish scholar and translator
- David Gilner: Director emeritus of HUC-JIR library system, former president of Association of Jewish Libraries and Council of Archives and Research Libraries in Jewish Studies
- Herbert Zafren: Former director, Historian of early Jewish printing, former president of Council of Archives and Research Libraries in Jewish Studies
- Adolph S. Oko: Former director, Biographer and Spinoza scholar, library director
- Michael Wilensky: Medieval Hebrew grammarian

=== Library Directors ===
- Sigmund Mannheimer, 1896-1903
- Judah L. Magnes, 1903-1904
- Max Schloessinger, 1904-1906
- Adolph S. Oko, 1906-1932
- Walter Rothman, 1932-1944
- Moses Marx, 1944-1945
- Irvin M. Levey, 1945-1948
- Isaac Goldberg, 1948-1950
- Herbert C. Zafren 1950-1991
- David J. Gilner, 1991-2017
- Laurel Wolfson, 2017-2023
- Jordan Finkin, 2023-Present

=== Directors of Libraries, HUC-JIR ===
In 1950, the school's administration decided to create a position that would preside over all four HUC-JIR libraries. This position was held by Cincinnati library directors until 2017, when the role was transferred to Yoram Bitton.

- Herbert C. Zafren, 1950-1991
- David J. Gilner, 1991-2017
- Yoram Bitton, 2017-2024
- Position currently vacant.
