= Sigmund Mannheimer =

German-born Jewish-American educator

Sigmund Mannheimer (May 16, 1835 – December 18, 1909) was a German-born Jewish-American educator.

== Life ==
Mannheimer was born on May 16, 1835, in Kemel, Duchy of Nassau, the son of Simon Mannheimer and Yette Levi.

Mannheimer attended the teachers' seminary in Bad Ems. He started working as a teacher in the Jewish school in Schierstein in 1853. He then worked as a teacher in the Jewish school in Hegenheim in 1858. In that year, he also published a German translation of Solomon Klein's "Die Wahrheit über den Talmud". He entered the University of Paris in 1861, graduating from there with a Bachelier ès Lettres in 1863. He began working for the University as Professor of German in 1864.

Mennheimer immigrated to America in 1865 and initially lived in Baltimore. He moved to New York City in 1867, St. Louis in 1873, and Rochester, New York, in 1876. During that time, he worked as a teacher. In 1884, he was appointed professor of exegesis and Aramaic at Hebrew Union College in Cincinnati, Ohio, as well as head of the Library. He served in those positions for 25 years, until his death. In 1909, the College awarded him an honorary D.D. degree. He published several translations, including Henri Jean Baptiste Anatole Leroy-Beaulieu's Anti-Semitism in 1897 and Solomon Alami's Iggereth Musar in 1898. He also wrote "Hebrew Reader and Grammar" in 1873, which in 1903 was in its fourth edition. He was also a contributor to The Jewish Encyclopedia.

In 1869, Mannheimer married Louise Herschman in a ceremony conducted by Rabbi David Einhorn. Louise was a writer in her own right as well as a communal worker. Their children included elocutionist Jennie Mannheimer, Rabbi Eugene Max Mannheimer, Rabbi Leo Mannheimer, and Edna Mannheimer.

Mannheimer died from myocarditis at the Home of Jewish Aged and Infirm in Cincinnati on December 18, 1909. He was attending services at the Home's chapel when he collapsed shortly after sitting down next to Gotthard Deutsch. He was buried in the Walnut Hills Jewish Cemetery.
