= Jennie Mannheimer =

American elocutionist, acting coach, and teacher of speech and drama

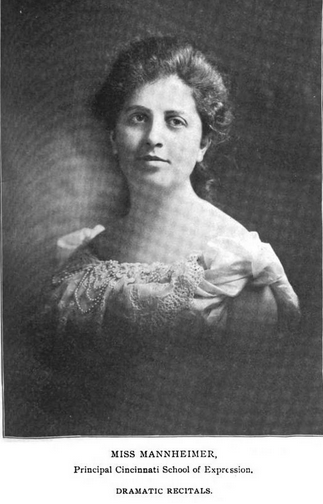
- Jennie Mannheimer, from a 1900 publication.
- Born: January 9, 1872
- Died: May 26, 1943 (aged 71)
- Parents: Sigmund Mannheimer (father); Louise Herschman Mannheimer (mother)

Jennie Mannheimer (January 9, 1872 – May 26, 1943), also known professionally as Jane Manner, was an American elocutionist, acting coach, and teacher of speech and drama.

== Early life ==
Mannheimer was born in New York City, the daughter of Louise Herschman Mannheimer and Sigmund Mannheimer. Her mother was a writer, translator, and inventor born in Prague, and her German-born father was a professor and librarian at Hebrew Union College. Both of her brothers became rabbis. Mannheimer was one of the first two women to earn a bachelor's degree in Hebrew Letters from Hebrew Union College, in 1888; she also earned degree from the University of Cincinnati, in 1892.

== Career ==
Mannheimer was director of the drama department at the Cincinnati College of Music from 1900 until 1907. She also ran her own school, the Cincinnati School of Expression (1894-1912). In 1914, she went traveling in Europe with her brother, only to encounter difficulty as the First World War began. Her letters home to Cincinnati were quoted in the newspaper as first-hand accounts of the volatile situation.

Mannheimer moved to New York, where she performed dramatic readings, including at a Red Cross benefit during World War I. She opened the Jane Manner Studio to teach acting. She also wrote several texts on the topic, including The Silver Treasury of Prose and Verse for Every Mood (1934), and the Junior Silver Treasury (1938).

She was founder of the Drama Recital Club, and a member of the New York Drama League, the New York League of American Pen Women, the Council of Jewish Women, and the Temple Emmanu-El Women's Auxiliary.

== Personal life ==
Mannheimer died in 1943, aged 71 years. Her papers were donated to the American Jewish Archives by her sister Edna B. Manner in the 1960s.
