= Hamborn Abbey =

Monastery

Coordinates: 51°29′25″N 6°45′47″E

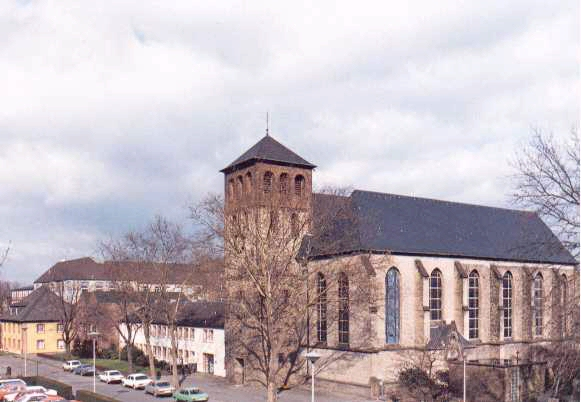
Hamborn Abbey

Hamborn Abbey (German: Abtei Hamborn) is a Premonstratensian monastery in the Alt-Hamborn district of Duisburg, Germany. The abbey is physically located in the diocese of Essen, although not formally part of it.

== History ==
The present abbey church originates in a small parish church built on an estate called "Havenburn" by the lords of Hochstaden in the 9th century.

Over time, the landowners leased the land surrounding the farm to peasants who settled here. Soon the name of the estate passed to the entire parish. The parish of Hamborn later became an independent jurisdiction.

In 1136 Gerhard von Hochstaden gave his possessions in Hamborn to the Archbishop of Cologne on condition that a Premonstratensian monastery should be built in the place of the parish church. After the conversion of the parish church to a Premonstratensian church and the construction of the cloister and the rest of the conventual buildings, the site was consecrated in 1170 and became an abbey.

After the Napoleonic occupation of the Rhineland by the French army this monastery was abolished, like almost all others. While the monastic estates fell to the state, the church was kept for the people of Hamborn as a parish church.

During World War II the abbey and the church were largely destroyed by Allied air raids.

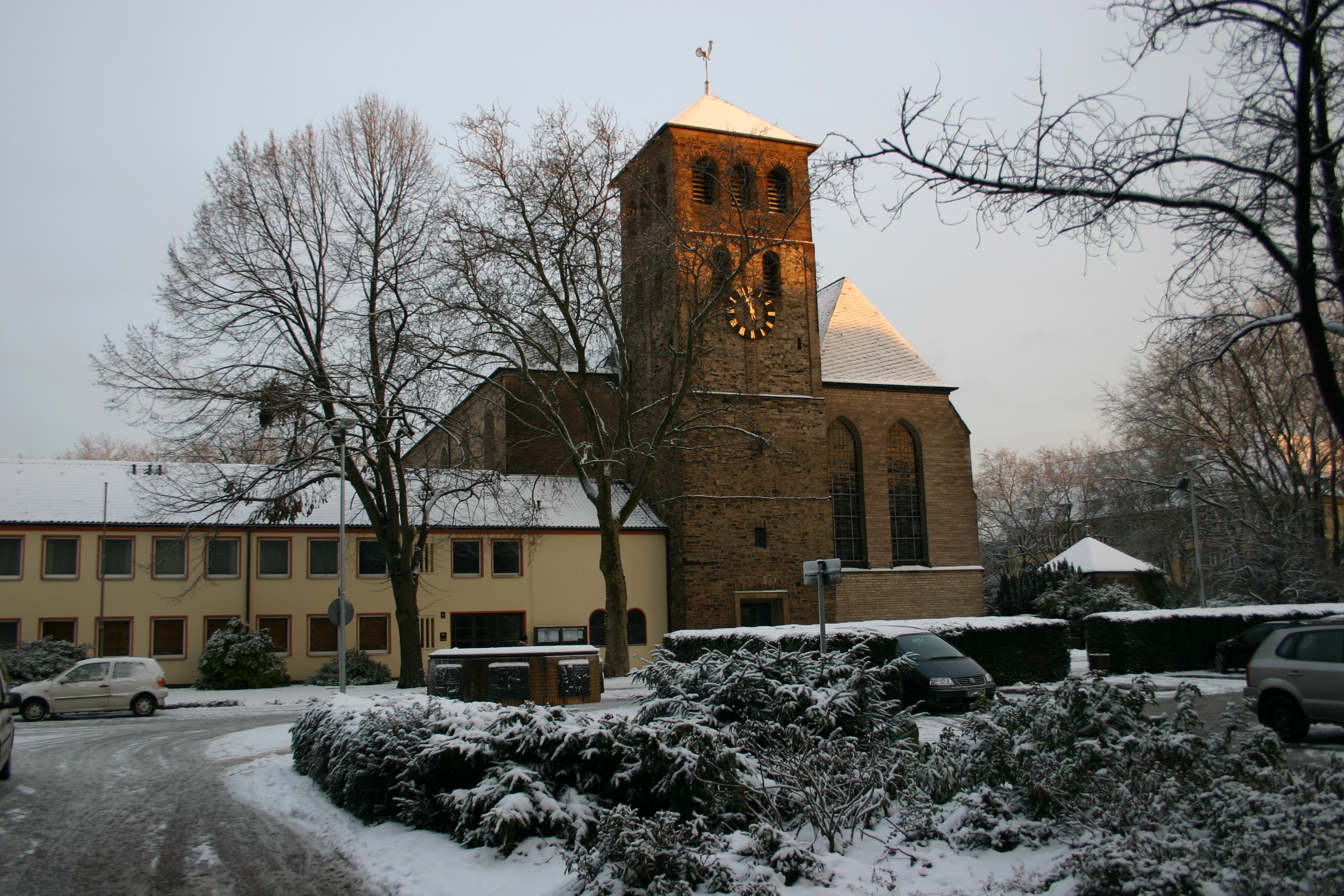
Abbey church

As part of the re-foundation of the diocese of Essen in 1958 Hamborn Abbey was re-established in 1959 and settled by Premonstratensians from Rot an der Rot Abbey. In 1994 it regained its abbatial status.

As of 2018 the community contains 23 canons including the abbot since 1995, Albert Thomas Dölken O.Praem. The canons are mostly engaged in pastoral work in the Duisburg area, but in addition some are also active in the diocesan administration, in secondary and higher education and as academics, as well as in various welfare and social projects. Besides its premises in Duisburg, Hamborn Abbey also oversees the Premonstratensian community in Magdeburg consisting of three monks, as an independent priory. The canons of Hamborn also undertake pastoral care in the former Premonstratensian abbeys of Cappenberg and Sayn.

The steady growth of the community made necessary the enlargement of the premises of the buildings, and a new building was dedicated in 2011.

On the abbey site are now also the Abbey School, the Abbey Centre, which is used in particular for conferences and cultural events and is equipped with a tourist office, as well as St. John's Hospital. The abbey is on the social front line of northern Duisburg with the districts of Marxloh and Bruckhausen in an area that no longer has a Christian majority. This sets the parameters of the abbey's social and pastoral work.

Besides the abbey church with its sights, the treasury can also be visited.

== Abbots and provosts ==
Albert Dölken's coat of arms

=== From 1959 ===
- Albert Thomas Dölken, abbot since 1995
- Gottfried Reinhold Menne, prelate 1988–1995
- Florian Joseph Pröll, abbot of Schlägl Abbey, abbey administrator 1965–1988
- Bernhard Mayer, prelate 1959 to 1965
- abbey closed 1806 – 1958

=== 12th century to 1806 ===
- Karl Adalbert von Bayer, abbot 1790 – 1806
- Alexander von der Horst, abbot 1782 – 1790
- Ferdinand von Dunckel, abbot 1757 – 1782
- Johan Arnold von Houven, abbot 1742 – 1757
- Heinrich von Daell, abbot 1726–1742
- Gottfried von Bemmel, abbot 1724 – 1726
- Wilhelm Heinrich von Bentinck, abbot 1705 – 1724
- Johann von Breidenbach, abbot 1694 – 1705
- Johann von Breidenbach, abbot 1677 – 1694
- Johann Albert Heerdt, abbot 1672 – 1677
- Wilhelm Gottfried von Hyllen, abbot 1647 – 1672
- Stephan von Stein, abbot 1619 – 1646
- Wilhelm Ingenhoven zu Gelinde, abbot 1603 – 1619
- Christoph von Husen, abbot 1553 – 1582
- Albert Hane, abbot 1544 – 1553
- Wilhelm von Wyenhorst, abbot 1517 – 1543
- Johann Stael von Holstein, abbot 1487 – 1517
- Elbert van den Bongart, abbot 1483 – 1487
- Hermann von Hiesfeld, abbot 1487
- Heinrich Rinsche, abbot 1451 – 1476
- Dietrich Estas, abbot 1426 – 1451
- Berthold von Brabeck, abbot 1417 – 1424
- Konstantin Kron, abbot 1392 – 1414
- Heinrich van den Berghe, abbot 1350 – 1388
- Heinrich Stecke, abbot 1325 – 1345
- Johann, abbot 1321 – 1322
- Arnold, abbot 1314 – 1318
- Gerhard, abbot 1308
- Christian, abbot 1306 – 1310
- Drudo, abbot to 1301
- Conrad, abbot 1297 – 1299
- Gottfried, abbot in 1295
- Laurentius, abbot 1287 – 1291
- Johann, abbot 1281 – 1290
- Gottschalk of Befreyt, abbot to 1272
- Dietrich, abbot to 1268
- Philipp, abbot in 1252
- Hermann von Holte, abbot 1231 – 1234
- Friedrich, abbot 1216 – 1230
- Dietrich, provost by 1208
- Volkwin, abbot 12th / 13th Century
- Gottfried, abbot 1195 – 1200
- Allardus, abbot 12th century
- Nicholas, provost 12th century
- Gernod, provost 1157 – 1166
- Lambert, provost in 1147

== Gallery ==
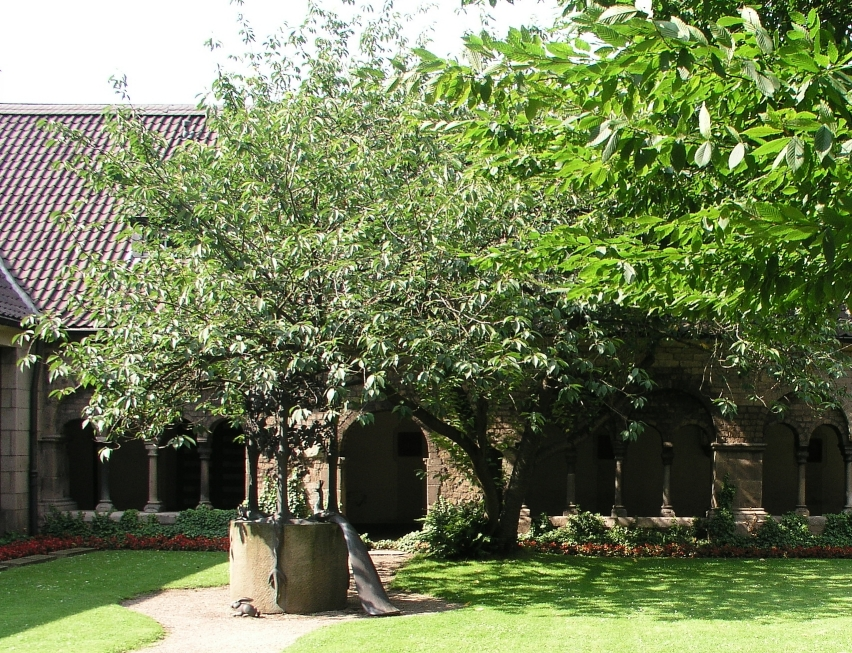
Cloisters

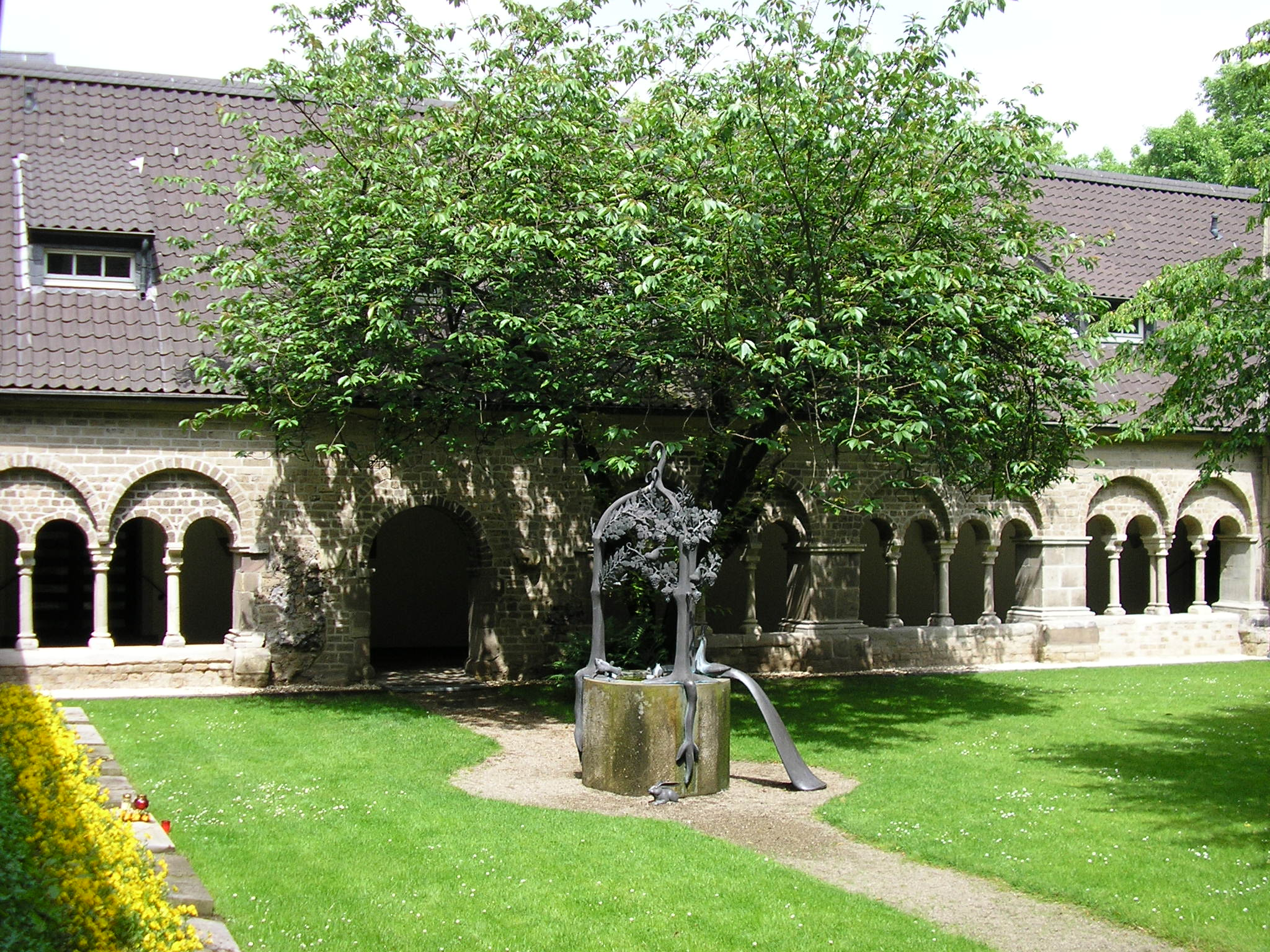
Cloisters

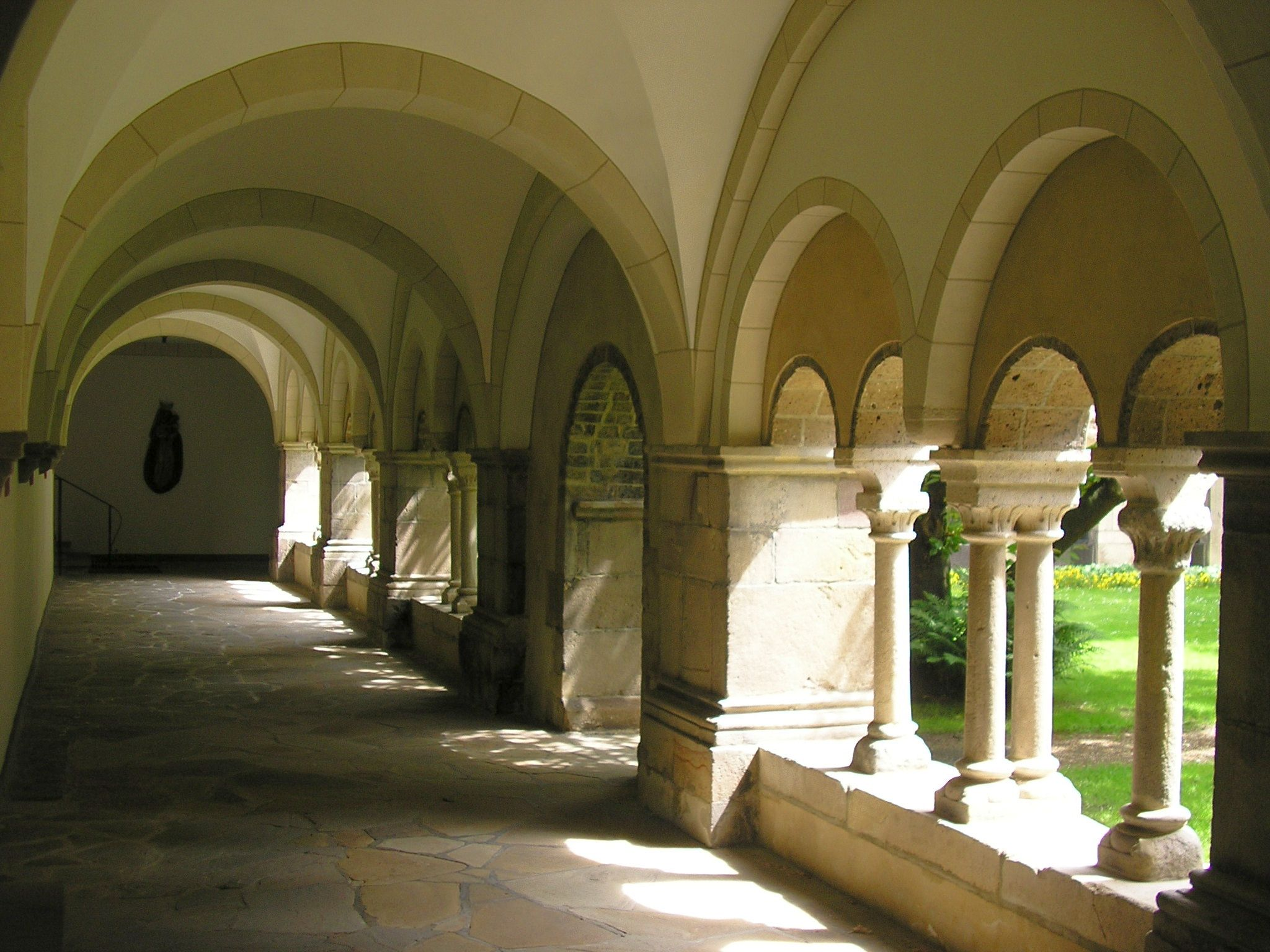
Cloisters

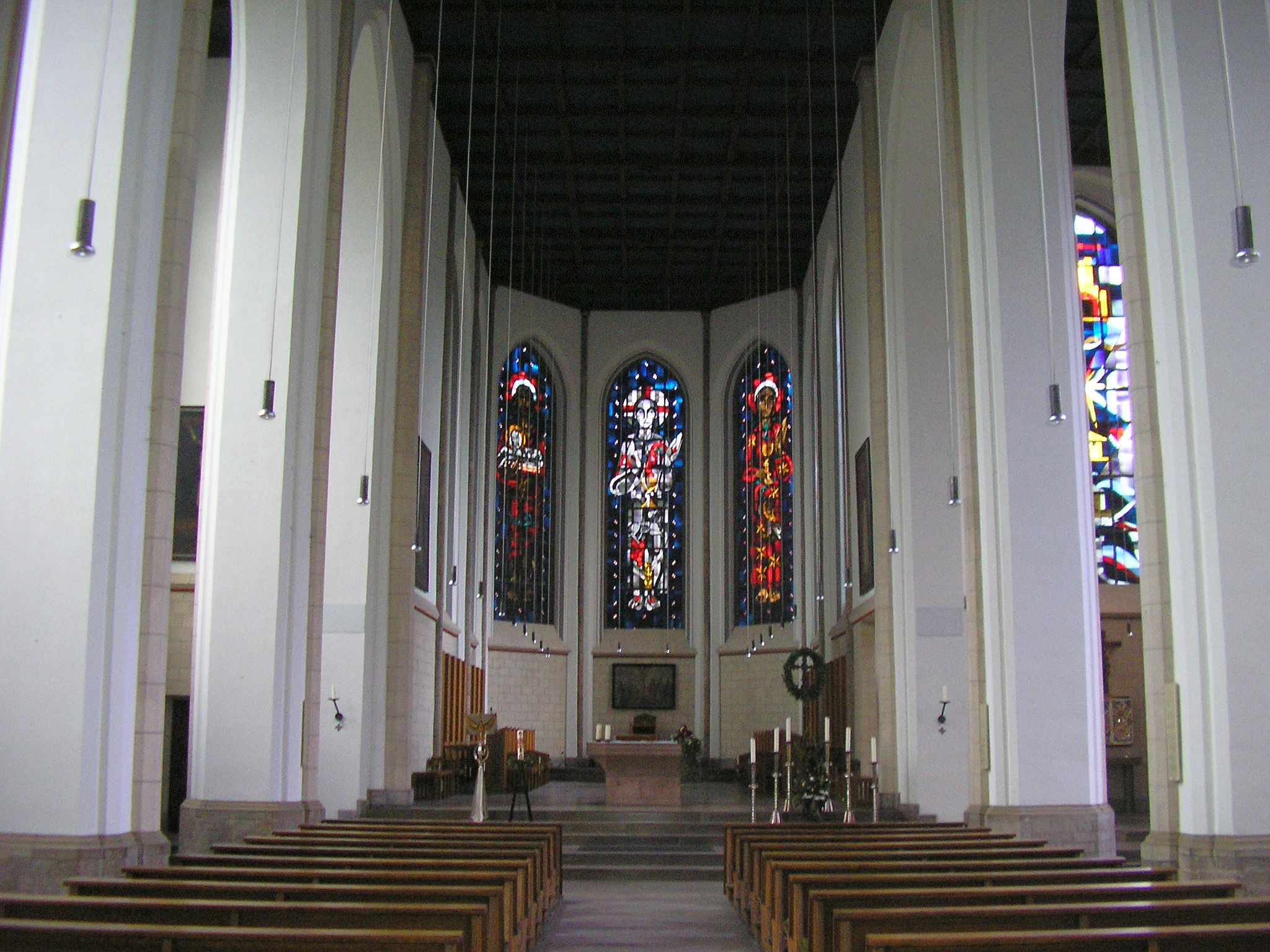
Inside Abbey Church

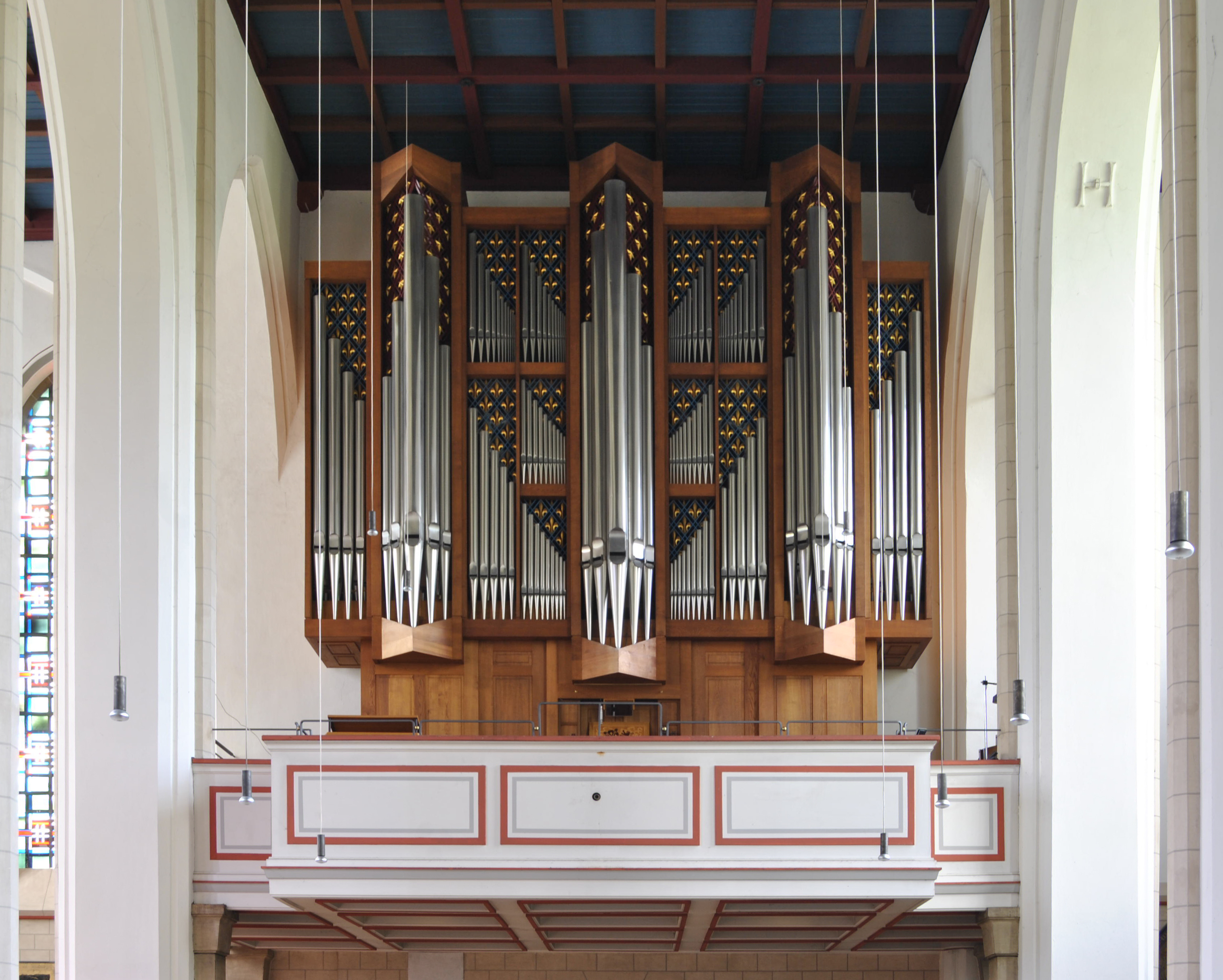
Abbey Church Organ

== Organ ==
The organ in the abbey church was built in 1986 by the firm of Mönch in Überlingen. The instrument has 45 registers with 3181 pipes on three manuals and pedal.
