= Ben-Zion Dinur =

Israeli politician and historian (1884–1973)

- בן ציון דינור
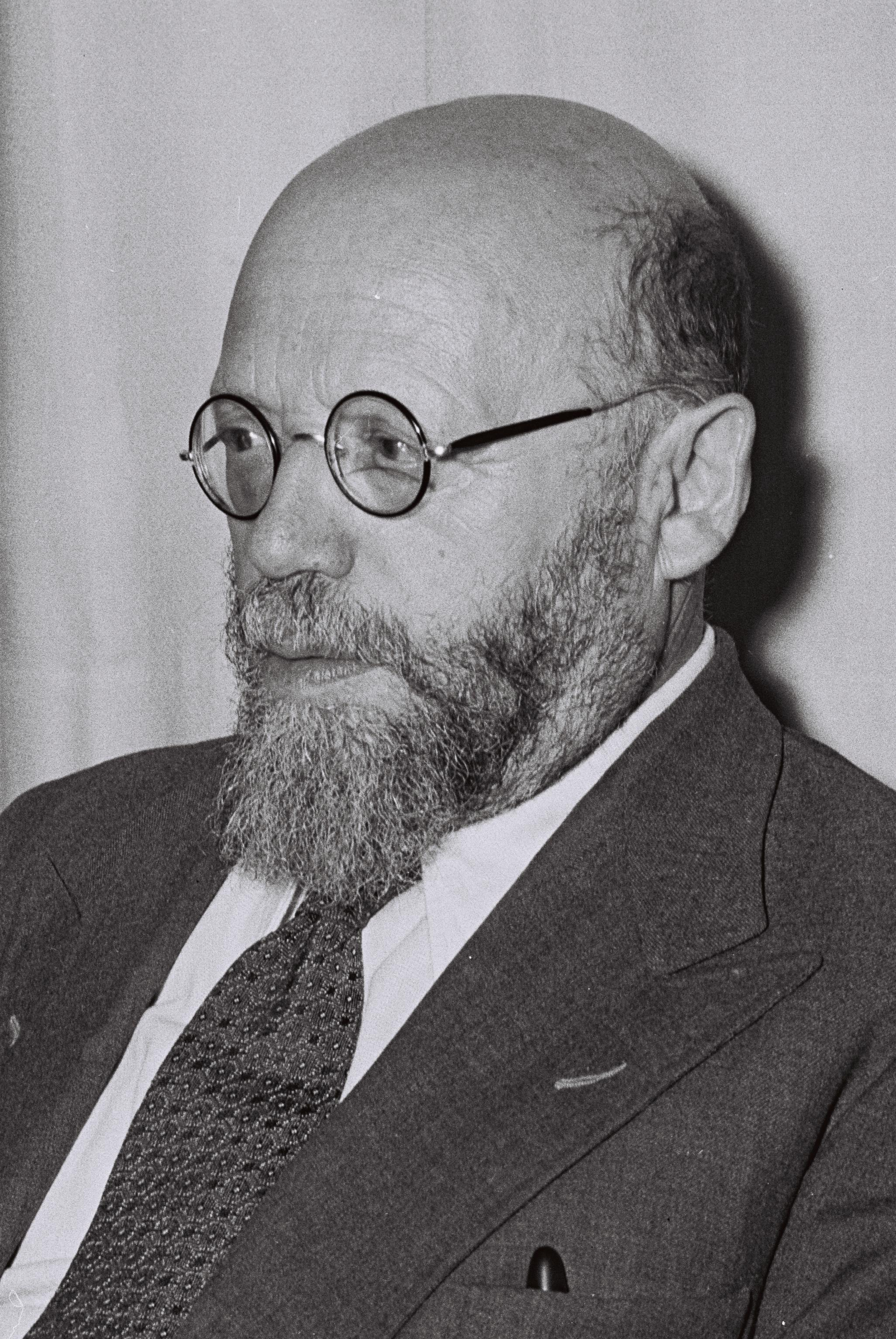
- Dinur in 1951

Ministerial roles
- 1951–1955: Minister of Education

Faction represented in the Knesset
- 1949–1951: Mapai

Personal details
- Born: Ben-Zion Dinaburg; 2 January 1884 Khorol, Russian Empire (now Poltava Oblast, Ukraine)
- Died: 8 July 1973 (aged 89)

Ben-Zion Dinur (Hebrew: בן ציון דינור; January 1884 – 8 July 1973) was a Ukrainian-born Israeli historian, educator, and politician. He held the position of professor of Jewish history at the Hebrew University of Jerusalem and represented Mapai in the first Knesset, serving as Minister of Education. Dinur was one of the founders of Yad Vashem and a member of the Israel Academy of Sciences.

The Dinur Center for Research in Jewish History was named in his honor.

== Biography ==
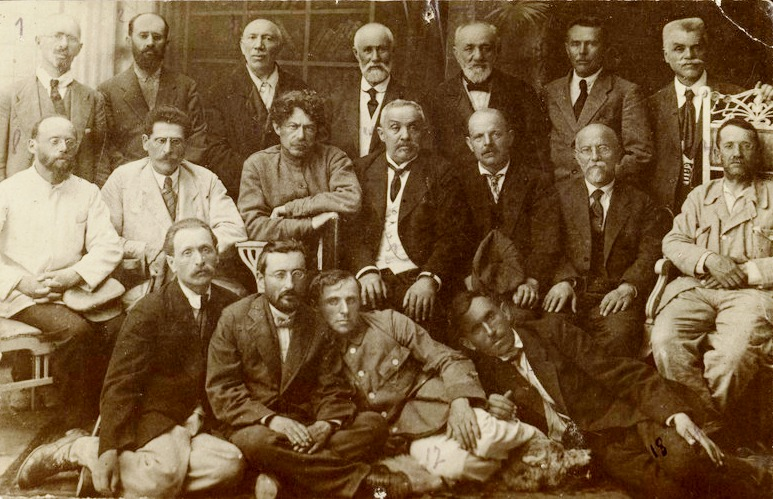
Ben-Zion Dinur (far left, middle row) with Hebrew writers in Odessa, 1921

Ben-Zion Dinaburg (later Dinur) was born in Khorol in the Russian Empire (now Poltava Oblast, Ukraine). He received his education in Lithuanian yeshivot. He studied under Shimon Shkop in the Telz Yeshiva, and became interested in the Haskalah through Rosh Yeshiva Eliezer Gordon's polemics. In 1898 he moved to the Slabodka yeshiva and in 1900 he traveled to Vilnius and was certified a Rabbi. He then went to Lyubavichi to witness the Chabad-Lubavitch branch of Hasidic Judaism. Between 1902 and 1911 he was engaged in Zionist activism and teaching, which at some point resulted in a brief arrest. In 1910 he married Bilhah Feingold, a teacher who had worked with him in a girls' trade school in Poltava. In 1911, he left his wife and son for two years to attend Berlin University, where he studied under Michael Rostovtzeff and Eugen Täubler. He then spent two more years at the University of Bern, where he began his dissertation under Rostovzev, on the Jews in the Land of Israel under the Roman Empire. The break of World War I forced him to move to the University of Petrograd. However, due to the October Revolution, he did not receive his PhD. He was a lecturer at Odesa University from 1920 to 1921.

== Pedagogic and academic career ==
In 1921, he immigrated to Palestine and from 1923 to 1948 served as a teacher and later as head of the Jewish Teachers' Training College, Jerusalem. In 1936, he was appointed lecturer in modern Jewish history at the Hebrew University and became professor in 1948 and professor emeritus in 1952.

Dinur advocated for a global historical approach to Jewish history and authored "The History of Israel from Its Early Days to Our Times". He also compiled the monumental work "Israel in the Exile" (1961–1966, originally Yisrael ba-gola), encompassing the history of the Jewish people up to the era of the Black Death. His pioneering research focused on community life, encompassing family, marriage, household arrangements, Torah and wisdom, beliefs, scholarly perspectives, burial practices, and festivals. Additionally, Dinur delved into interrelations between Jews, non-Jews, anusim, meshumadim and proselytes. He supplemented his works with responsa, illustrations, photographs, manuscripts, and legal details. Moreover, Dinur explored various Jewish streams, internal disputes, persecutions, religious debates between Jews and Christians, and messianic movements.

As a historian he described Zionism in the diaspora as "a huge river into which flowed all the smaller streams and tributaries of the Jewish struggle down the ages", and tracing its origins to 1700, when history records a first wave of Polish Jews emigrating to Jerusalem. He believed "messianic ferment" played a crucial role in Jewish history, and introduced the idea of mered hagalut ("Revolt of the Diaspora").

His most notable historical works include "Israel in Its Land" and "Israel in Exile". He also authored two autobiographical books detailing his life against the backdrop of his era: "In a Sunken World" and "In Days of War and Revolution".

== Political career and public office ==
He was elected to the first Knesset on the Mapai list and served as Minister of Education and Culture in the third to sixth governments (1951 to 1955), when he was responsible for the 1953 State Education Law, which put an end to the prevailing party "trend" education system.

Dinur, decommissioned the 50 square meter commemorative painting of the first Knesset by School of Paris artist Yitzhak Frenkel, and removed the portraits of Israel's first parliamentarians, resulting in the partly finished artwork never being completed.

From 1953 to 1959 he was president of Yad Vashem.

== Awards and recognition ==
- Dinur was twice a recipient of the Israel Prize, which was established at his initiative when he was Minister of Education:
  - in 1958 for Jewish studies; and
  - in 1973 for education.
- He was a recipient of the Yakir Yerushalayim (Worthy Citizen of Jerusalem) award in 1967, the year of the award's inauguration.

== Published works ==
- Toldot Yisrael" (The History of Israel) (1918) (in Hebrew)
- Lovers of Zion (1932–1934) (in Hebrew)
- Our Rabbi Moshe Ben Maimon: His Life, Writings, Activities and Views (1935) (in Hebrew)
- Simon Dubnow: for his 75th Birthday (1936) (in Hebrew)
- Israel in its Land: From the First Days of Israel until the Babylonian Exile: Sources and Documents (1938) (in Hebrew)
- Path Makers: Prominent Figures in the Sad History of the Return to Zion and the Renewal of Israel (1946) (in Hebrew)
- The Changing of the Generations: Researches and Studies in the History of Israel from Early Modern Times (1955) (in Hebrew)
- In Memory of Ahad Ha'am (1957) (in Hebrew)
- Values and Methods: Problems of Education (1958) (in Hebrew)
- A Vanished World: Memories of a Way of Life (Biography) (1958) (in Hebrew)
- Remember: Issues of the Holocaust and its Lessons (1958) (in Hebrew)
- Israel in Exile 2nd Edition (expanded) five volumes (1958) (in Hebrew)
- Days of War and Revolution: Memories of a Way of Life (1961) (in Hebrew)
- My Generation: Characteristics and Traits of Scholars and Educators, Public Personalities and Gate Keepers (1964) (in Hebrew)
- Benjamin Zeev Herzl: the Man, his Path and Personality, his Vision and Activities (1968) (in Hebrew)
- Tractate Avot: Commentary and Explanation with Introduction (1972) (in Hebrew)
- The Struggle of the Generations of Israel for its Land: from the Destruction of Betar until the Renewal of Israel (1975) (in Hebrew)
- Generations of the Bible: Research and Studies to Understand the Bible and the History of Israel in that Period (1977) (in Hebrew)
- Generations and Impressions: Researches and Studies in Israeli Historiography, its Problems and its History (1978) (in Hebrew)

== See also ==
- List of Israel Prize recipients
