= Hamborn =

Municipality of Duisburg, Germany

Coordinates: 51.4975°N 6.7778°E

Hamborn Coat of Arms

Hamborn (German pronunciation: [ˈhambɔʁn]) is a district of the city of Duisburg, in North Rhine-Westphalia (Germany). Hamborn has a population of 71,528 an area of 20.84 km^{2}. Since 1 January 1975, has been one of seven districts or boroughs (Stadtbezirk) of Duisburg.

== History ==
The city of Hamborn was incorporated into Duisburg in 1929. Until the merger, Hamborn was an independent city and at that time was one of the 40 largest cities in Germany.

Earliest mention of Hamborn is around 962AD as Havenburn, meaning Cattle trough. The land was given to the Archbishop of Cologne, to build a Premonstratensian monastery in 1136 by count Gerhard von Hochstaden. The Abbey and the neighboring farming communities were part of the Duchy of Cleves and became in 1666AD part of Brandenburg, Prussia. Until the early 19th century Hamborn was still a small village.

== Climate ==
Climate data for Duisburg
Month	Jan	Feb	Mar	Apr	May	Jun	Jul	Aug	Sep	Oct	Nov	Dec	Year
Mean daily maximum °C (°F)	4 (39)	5 (41)	8 (46)	12 (54)	17 (63)	20 (68)	22 (72)	22 (72)	18 (64)	14 (57)	8 (46)	5 (41)	13 (55)
Daily mean °C (°F)	2 (36)	3 (37)	5 (41)	8 (46)	13 (55)	16 (61)	17 (63)	17 (63)	14 (57)	11 (52)	6 (43)	3 (37)	10 (49)
Mean daily minimum °C (°F)	0 (32)	0 (32)	2 (36)	5 (41)	9 (48)	12 (54)	13 (55)	13 (55)	11 (52)	8 (46)	3 (37)	1 (34)	6 (44)
Average precipitation mm (inches)	81.3 (3.20)	55.9 (2.20)	76.2 (3.00)	68.6 (2.70)	73.7 (2.90)	96.5 (3.80)	88.9 (3.50)	76.2 (3.00)	73.7 (2.90)	71.1 (2.80)	83.8 (3.30)	88.9 (3.50)	934.8 (36.8)
Source: weather.com

== Landmarks ==
Landmarks in Hamborn include:

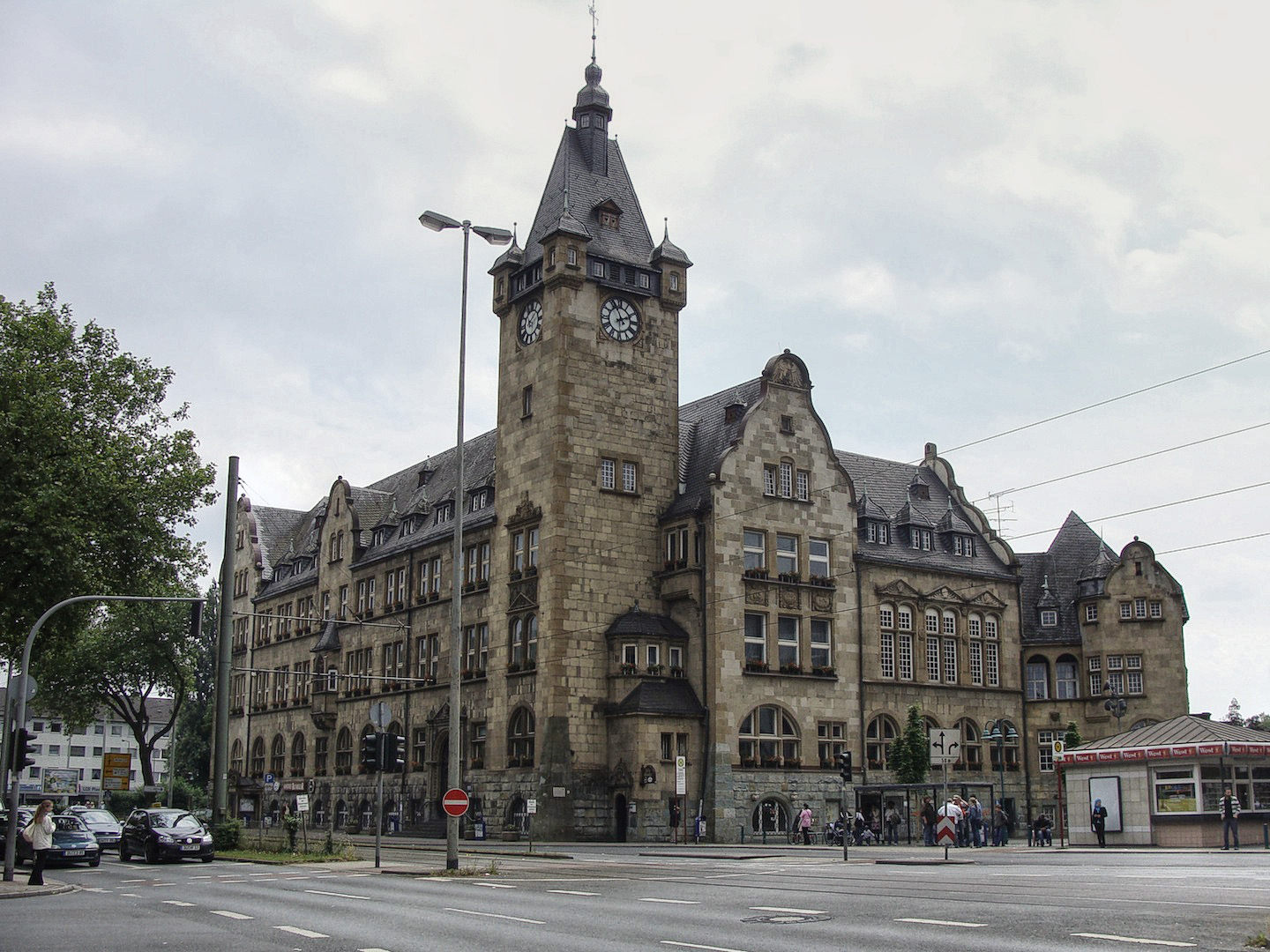
Hamborn Rathaus.

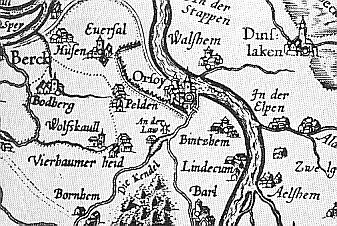
Hamborn area 1591

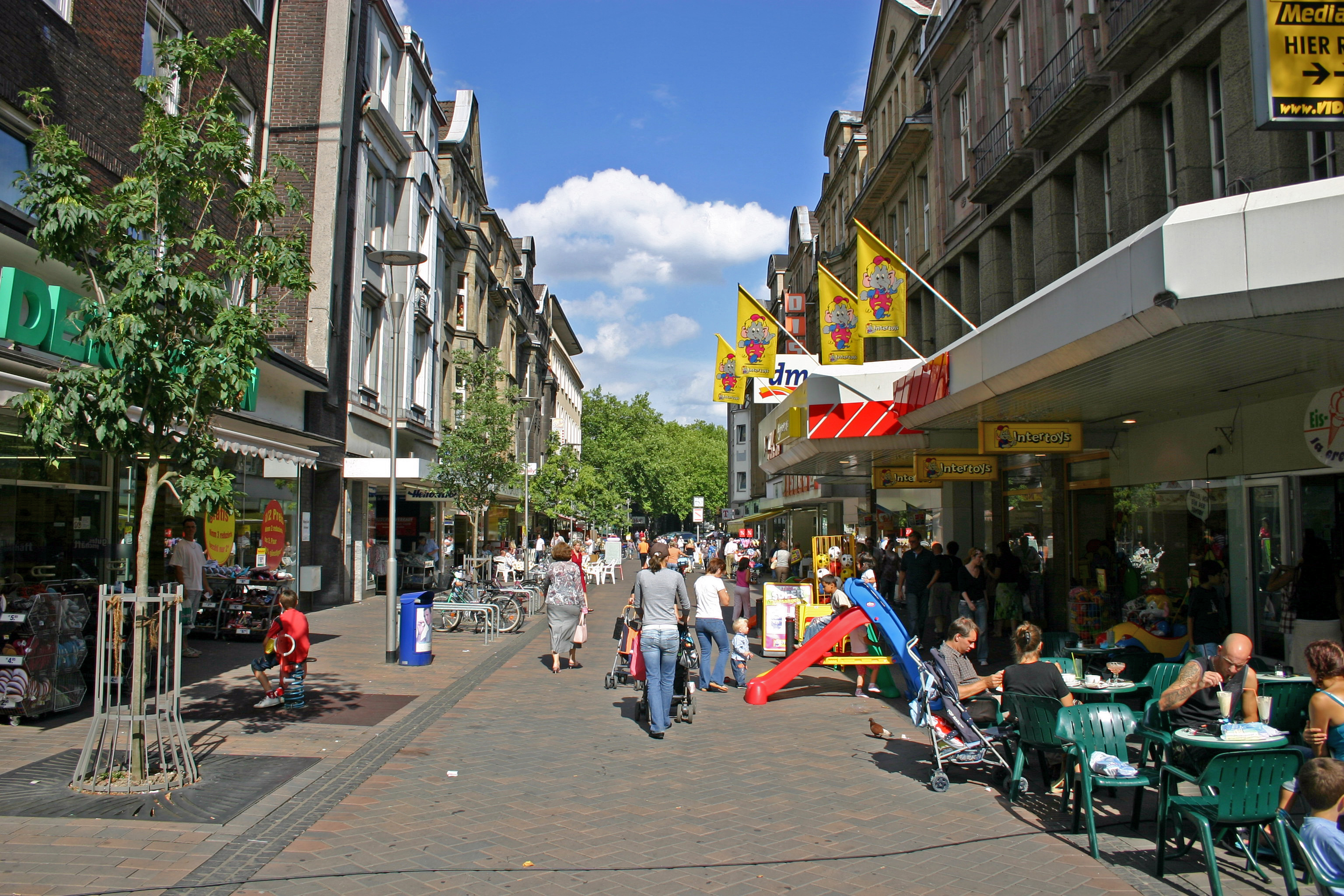
Jaegerstraße Street

- Hamborn Abbey (Abtei Hamborn), Hamborn, Duisburg: Premonstratensian Canons 1136–1802, 1959-today
- Botanischer Garten Duisburg-Hamborn (Botanical Gardens)
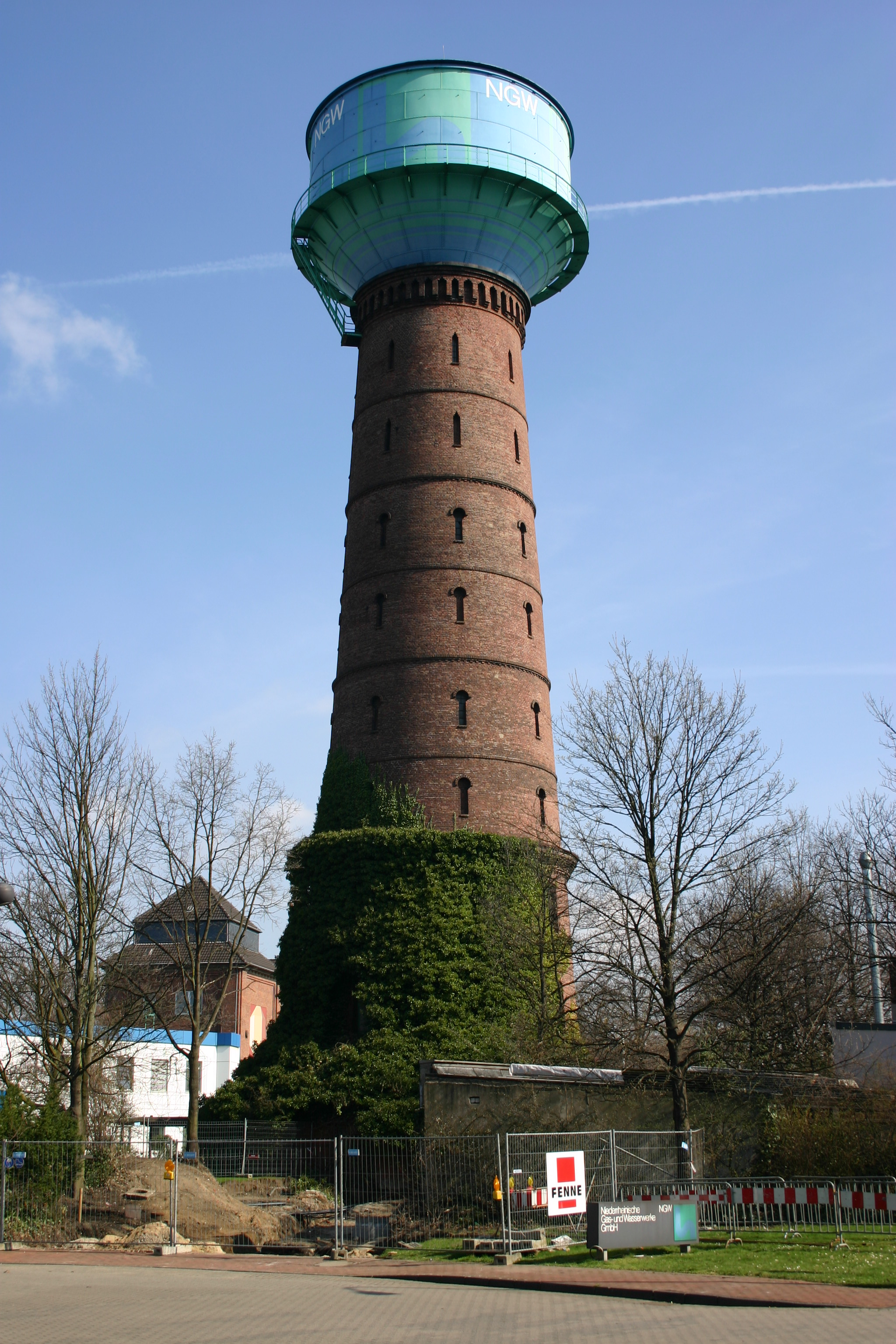
Watertower in Alleestraße Street

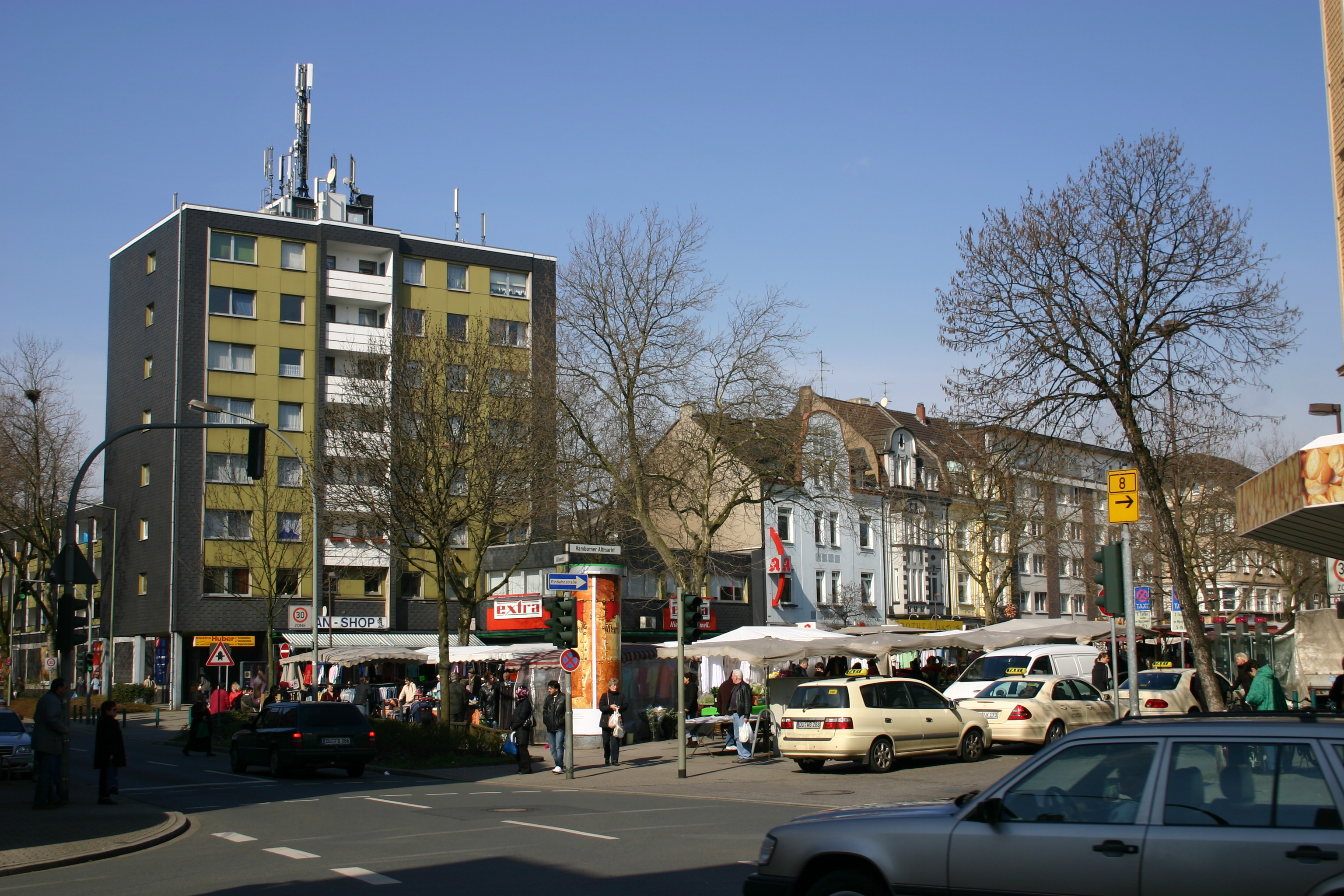
Hamborner Old town market

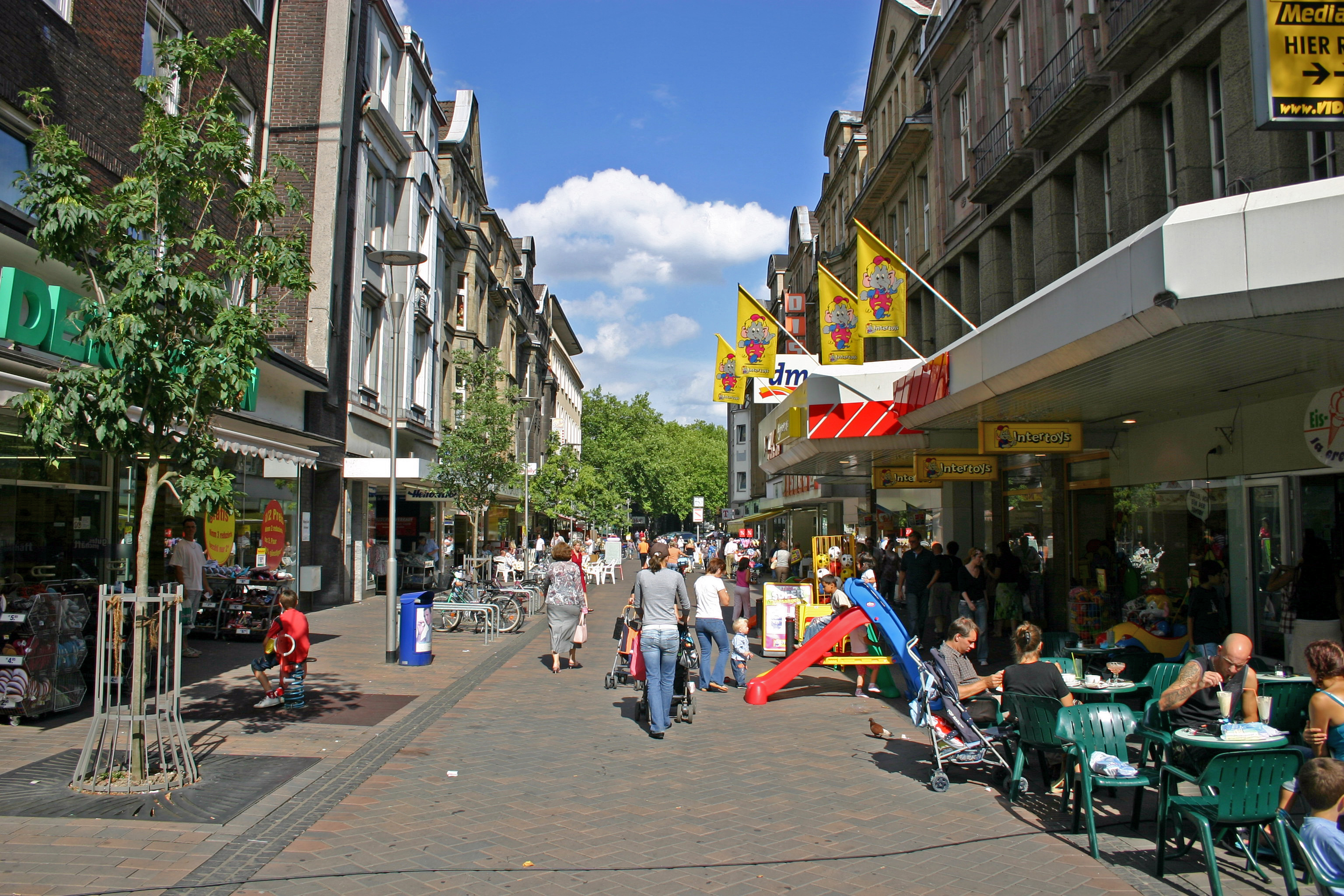
Einkaufsmeile, Jägerstraße Street

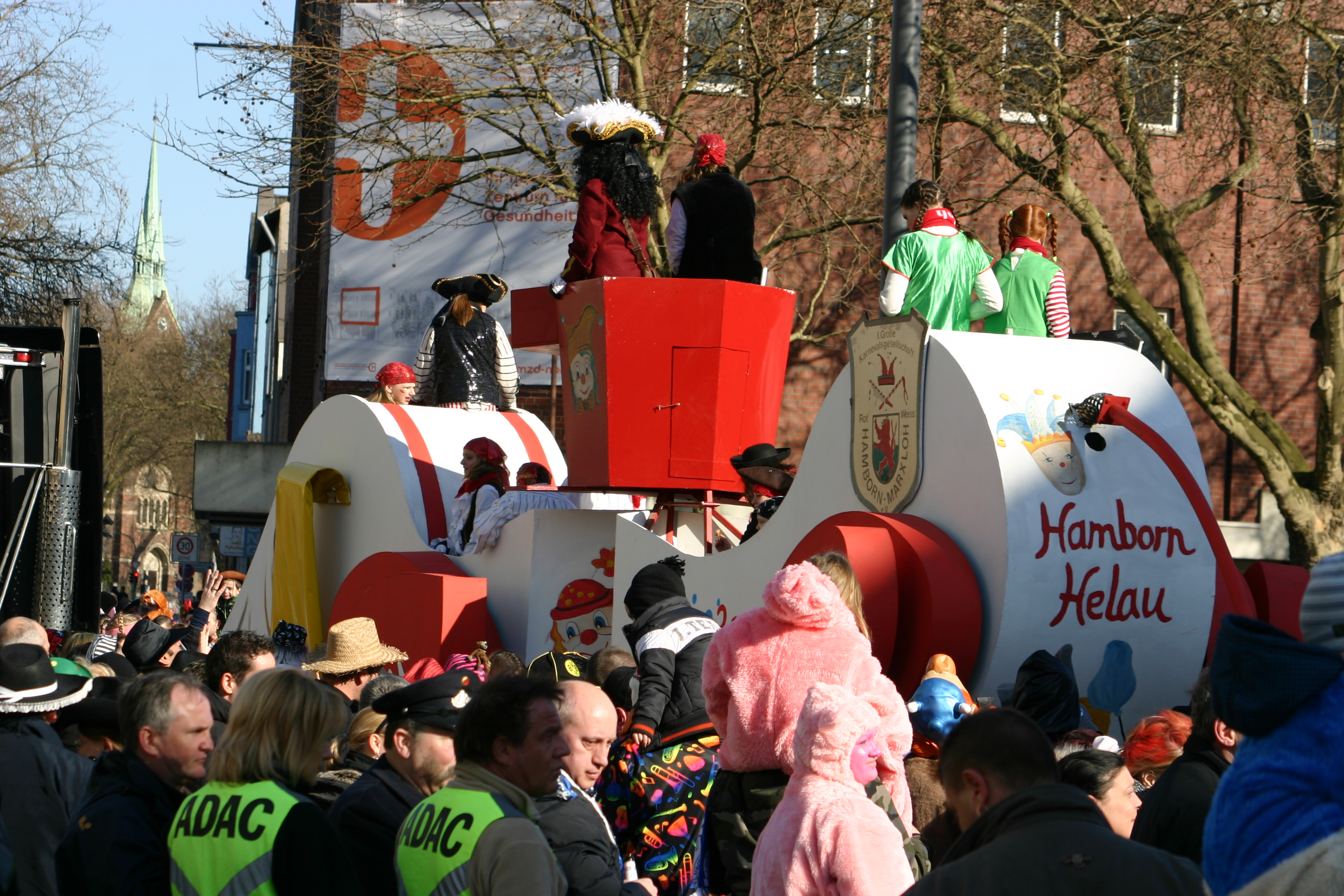
Kinderkarnevalszug in Hamborn

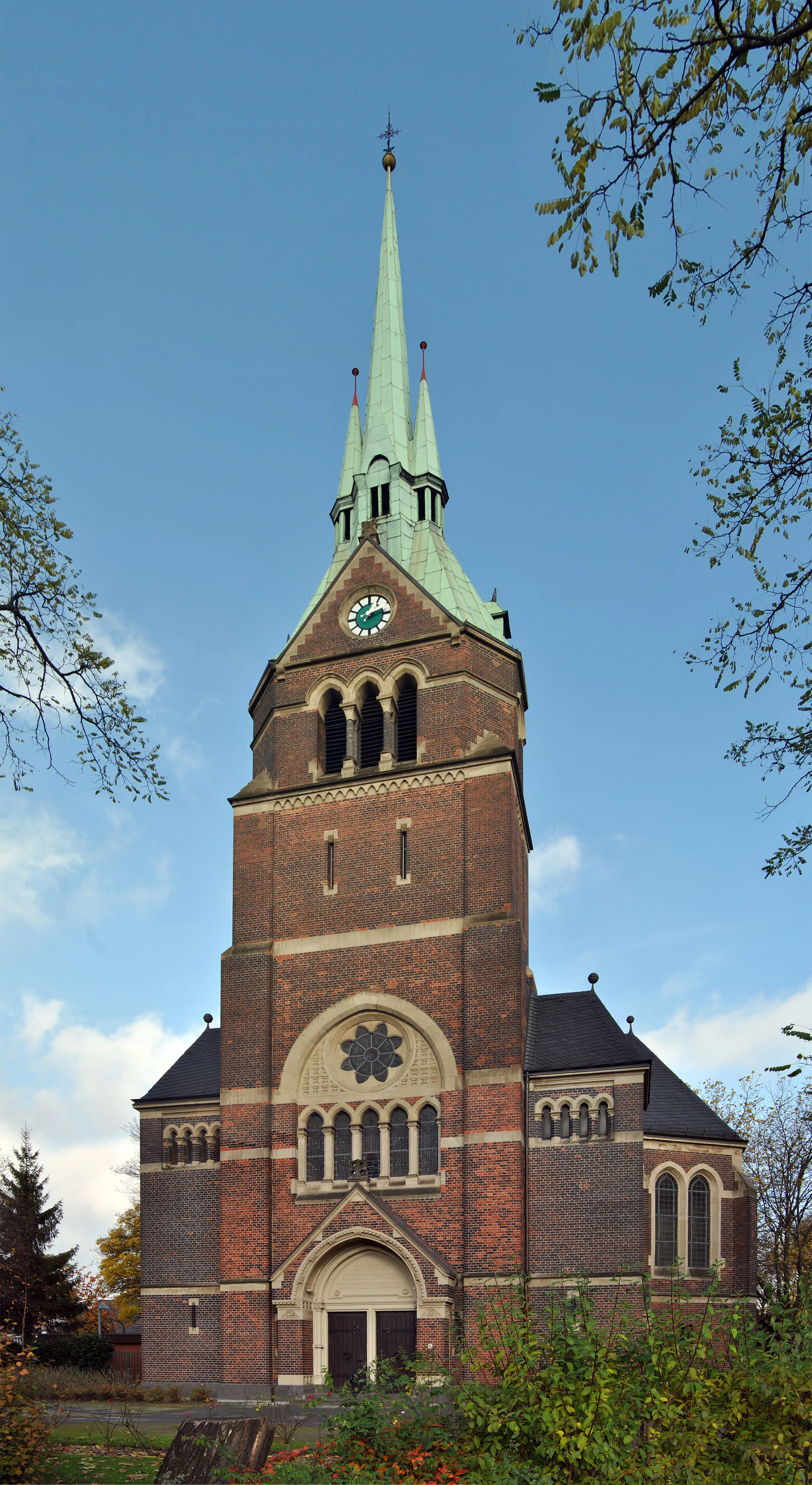
Church of peace, Duisburger Street, (1897) by Karl Doflein.

== Notable people ==
- Manfred Adamski (1947–2005), Chairman of the König-Brauerei, Chairman of MSV Duisburg
- Jacques Berndorf (born 1936) (actually Michael Preute), journalist and writer
- Hanns-Heinz Bielefeld (born 1918), politician
- Albert Thomas Dölken (born 1960), Abbot of Hamborn
- Clemens Dölken (born 1956), Roman Catholic priest
- Tadeusz Gwiazdowski (1918–1983), Polish actor
- Walter Hellmich (born 1944), football functionaries and Contractors
- Ludger Horstkötter (born 1939), Roman Catholic priest and historian
- Fritz Ketz (1903–1983), painter and graphic artist
- Ernst Kozub (1924–1971), heroic tenor
- Karl A. Lamers (born 1951), CDU member of the Bundestag
- Sören Link (born 1976), SPD member of parliament, mayor of Duisburg
- Daniel Morian (1811–1887), mining entrepreneur and alderman
- Hermann Ostfeld (1912-1996), rabbi and jurist
- Johannes Pflug (born 1946), SPD member of the Bundestag
- Frithjof Elmo Porsch (born 1924), writer
- Werner Scholz (1944), soccer players and coaches
- Hanns Heinrich Schumacher (born 1948), diplomat and ambassador
- Rudolf Stampfuß (1904–1978), prehistorians
- Karl Heinz Stroux (1908–1985), actor, director and theater director
- Heinz Trökes (1913–1997), painter and graphic artist
- Sabine Weiss (born 1958), Mayor of Dinslaken and parliamentarian
- Ursula Woelfel (1922–2014), children's book author
- Rini van Woerden (1934–2004), Dutch footballer
- Paul Zielinski (1911–1966), football player, World Cup finalists in Italy in 1934
