= Hochschule für die Wissenschaft des Judentums =

Jewish Studies Research Center and Rabbinical Seminary in Berlin

Coordinates: 52.5240°N 13.3921°E

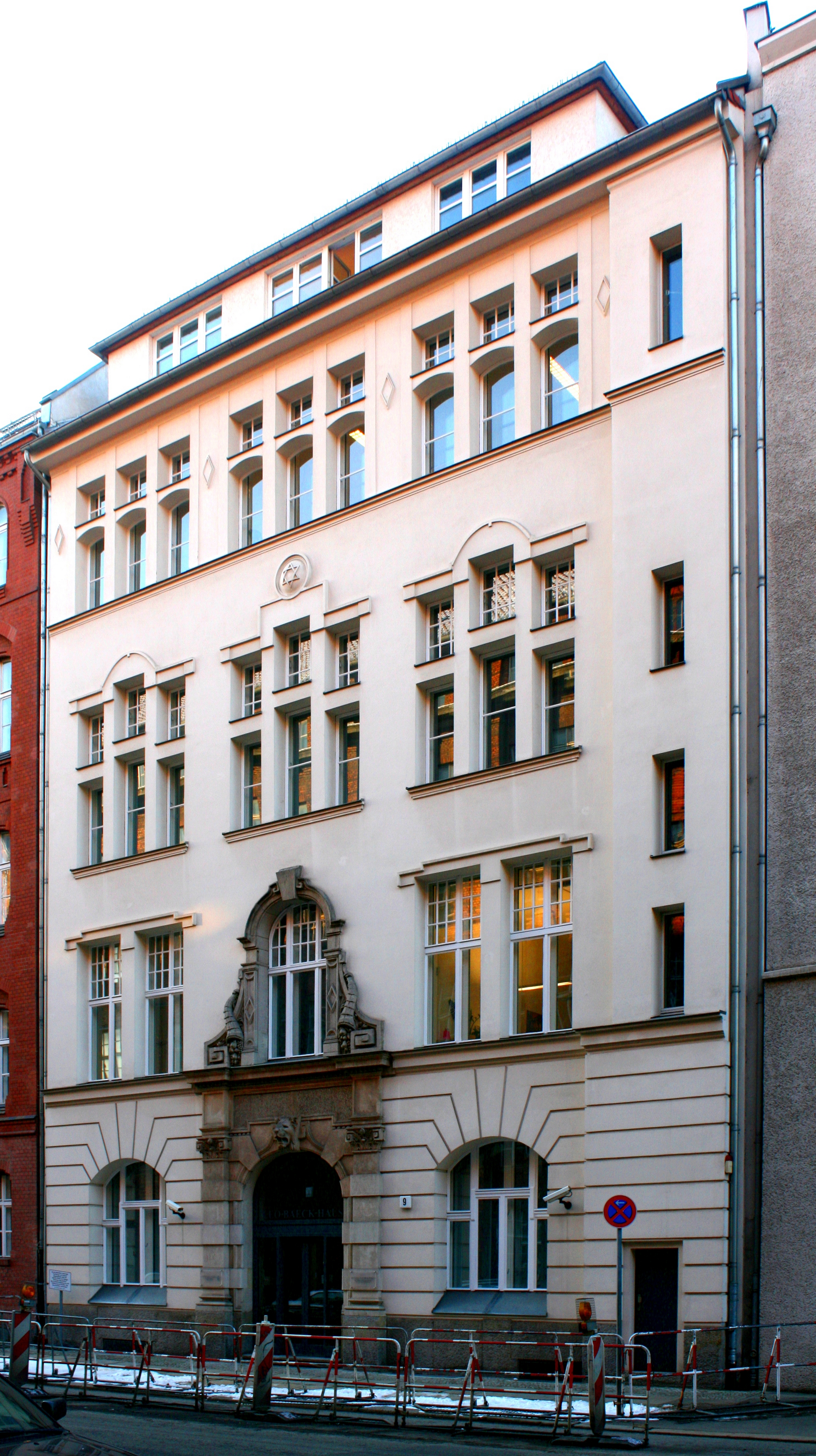
The former building of the Hochschule für die Wissenschaft des Judentums at Tucholskystraße 9 in Berlin (since 1999 named Leo-Baeck-Haus and seat of the Central Council of Jews in Germany)

Hochschule für die Wissenschaft des Judentums, or Higher Institute for Jewish Studies, was a rabbinical seminary established in Berlin in 1872 and closed down by the Nazi government of Germany in 1942. Upon the order of the government, the name was officially changed (1883–1923 and 1933–1942) to Lehranstalt für die Wissenschaft des Judentums.

== History ==
Abraham Geiger, who had been active in establishing Reform Judaism, wanted a university for Jewish studies in Berlin. Unable to become part of the University of Berlin, he was involved in 1870 in creating a separate institution. Also involved were David Cassel, Israel Lewy, Moritz Lazarus and Heymann Steinthal, the Jewish "intellectuals" and professors at the University of Berlin.

Geiger's "General Introduction to the Science of Judaism," "Introduction to the Biblical Writings" and "Lectures on Pirḳe Abot" were originally delivered as lectures at the seminary. Some of the best German-Jewish teachers taught there in the spirit of the Wissenschaft des Judentums movement: Hanoch Albeck, Ismar Elbogen, Julius Grünthal, Julius Guttmann, Franz Rosenthal, Harry Torczyner, and Leo Baeck.

Moritz Steinschneider referred to the Hochschule as a "new ghetto of Jewish learning," which he felt could ultimately not produce the standards of scholarship achieved in the university setting.

Officially the institution was not affiliated with a movement or denomination. It sought free inquiry and research without any restrictions. It stood for a conservative Judaism, but its main object was the scientific study of things Jewish, freed as far as possible from denominational disputes. There was no religious test for professors but it was assumed that all of the faculty lived according to the Jewish tradition and were fluent in Hebrew. As the school was never dependent on any religious or public organization, the board was constantly engaged in raising money from wealthy contributors, sponsors of scholarly "chairs" and scholarships.

In 1872, the first year, there were only 12 students, including four women. In 1921, there were 63 full-time and 45 part-time students enrolled in the Hochschule. Many of the students came from Eastern European countries, notably Poland, as graduates of Orthodox Yeshivot. By 1930–33 the school had achieved so great a reputation that many non-Jews, especially Christian clergy, enrolled.

== Notable alumni ==
- Leo Baeck (1873–1956) as a student 1894–1895; as a lecturer 1913–1942. Baeck was a rabbi, scholar and theologian. He served as leader of Reform Judaism in his native country and internationally, and later represented all German Jews during the Nazi era. After the Second World War, he settled in London, UK, where he served as the chairman of the World Union for Progressive Judaism.
- Arthur Biram (1878–1967), philosopher, philologist, and educator, who emigrated to Ottoman Palestine in 1913
- Aron Brand (1910– 1977) who became a pediatric cardiologist in Israel, where he founded the Jerusalem Academy of Medicine
- Mordecai Ehrenpreis
- Emil L. Fackenheim
- Abraham Joshua Heschel
- Ellen Littmann
- Regina Jonas
- Franz Kafka
- Alice Lucas
- Philip Magnus
- Arno Nadel
- Claude Montefiore
- Samuel Poznanski
- Herman Schaalman (1916–2017), who became senior rabbi at the Emanuel Congregation of Chicago and also an interfaith activist
- Solomon Schecter
- Max Schloessinger
- Shmaryahu Levin (1867–1935), Zionist activist. He was a member of the first elected Russian Parliament for the Constitutional Democratic Party in 1906.
- Henry Slonimsky
- Selma Stern (1890–1981), one of the first women in Germany to become a professional historian; a research fellow at the Akademie für die Wissenschaft des Judentums which was founded at the Hochschule in 1919
- Manfred Swarsensky (1905–1981), who graduated from the Hochschule with a PhD in 1929. He was rabbi, for 36 years, at Temple Beth El, a Reform synagogue in Madison, Wisconsin.
- Israel Taglicht (1862−1943), Chief Rabbi of Vienna
- Werner van der Zyl (1902–1984), who became a rabbi in Berlin and in London, where he was the prime mover and first director of studies of what was to become the Leo Baeck College
- Miriam Yalan-Shteklis (1900–1984), writer and poet
- Hermann Ostfeld, rabbi and jurist
