= Ellen Littmann =

Ellen Littmann (1909-1975) was a German-Jewish scholar of Judaism and the first woman to graduate from the Hochschule für die Wissenschaft des Judentums, the rabbinic seminary of German Jewry. Littmann was later associated with the Leo Baeck College of London where she taught biblical studies.

== Biography ==
Born in Danzig in 1909, Ellen Littmann was attracted to Jewish studies from a young age and sought to study at the Hochschule. Rabbi Leo Baeck encouraged her to study and persuaded her parents to agree to this pursuit on the basis that Littmann would receive a teaching position after graduation. While Littmann did not receive rabbinical ordination, she was qualified to academically teach Jewish studies. In 1928, Littmann received a doctorate from the University of Cologne, her thesis concerned the re-admission of Jews into German towns following the Black Death. Littmann later moved to London where she taught at Leo Baeck College. Rabbi Dr. Werner van der Zyl was instrumental in recruiting Littmann to her position at the college.

== Writings and publications ==
- Littmann, E. (1928). Studien zur Wiederaufnahme der Juden durch die deutschen Städte nach dem schwarzen Tode. Ein Beitrag zur Geschichte der Judenpolitik der deutschen Städte im späten Mittelalter. Monatsschrift für Geschichte und Wissenschaft des Judentums, (H. 11/12), 576-600.
- Littmann, E. (1935). David Friedländers Sendschreiben an Probst Teller und sein Echo. Zeitschrift für die Geschichte der Juden in Deutschland, 6, 92-112.
- Littmann, E. (1959). Unser Lehrer. Worte des Gedenkens für Leo Baeck, 171-173.
- Littmann, E. (1960). Saul Ascher: First Theorist of Progressive Judaism. The Leo Baeck Institute Year Book, 5(1), 107-121.
- Littmann, E. (1973). The First Ten Years of the Leo Baeck College'. Reform Judaism: Essays on Reform Judaism in Britain, 160-78.

== See also ==
- Regina Jonas
