= Congregation Beth Israel Ner Tamid (Milwaukee) =

Beth Israel Ner Tamid
- Hebrew: בית ישראל
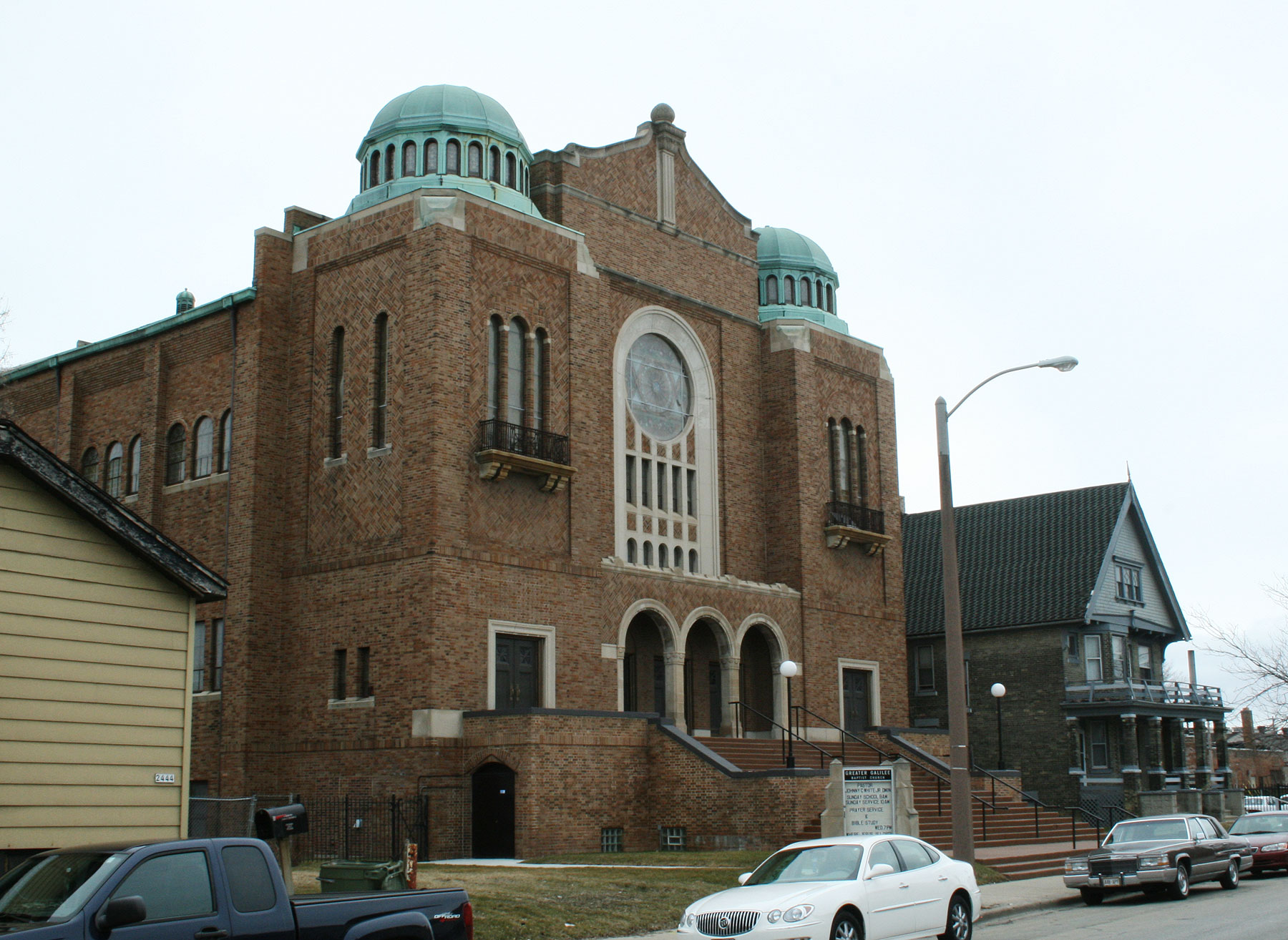

- Location in Wisconsin

Religion
- Affiliation: Conservative Judaism
- Ecclesiastical or organisational status: Synagogue
- Leadership: Rabbi: Joel Alter; Cantor Jeremy Stein
- Status: Active

Location
- Location: 6880 North Green Bay Avenue, Glendale, Milwaukee
- Country: United States
- Administration: United Synagogue of Conservative Judaism
- Coordinates: 43°08′32″N 87°56′02″W

Architecture
- Established: 1884 (as a congregation); 1901 (reconstituted)
- Groundbreaking: 1959
- Completed: 1891 (Fifth Street); 1925 (Teutonia Avenue); 1962, 1966, and 1980 (North Green Bay Avenue)

Website
- cbintmilwaukee.org

- Temple Beth Israel (former) (now Greater Galilee Baptist Church)
- U.S. National Register of Historic Places
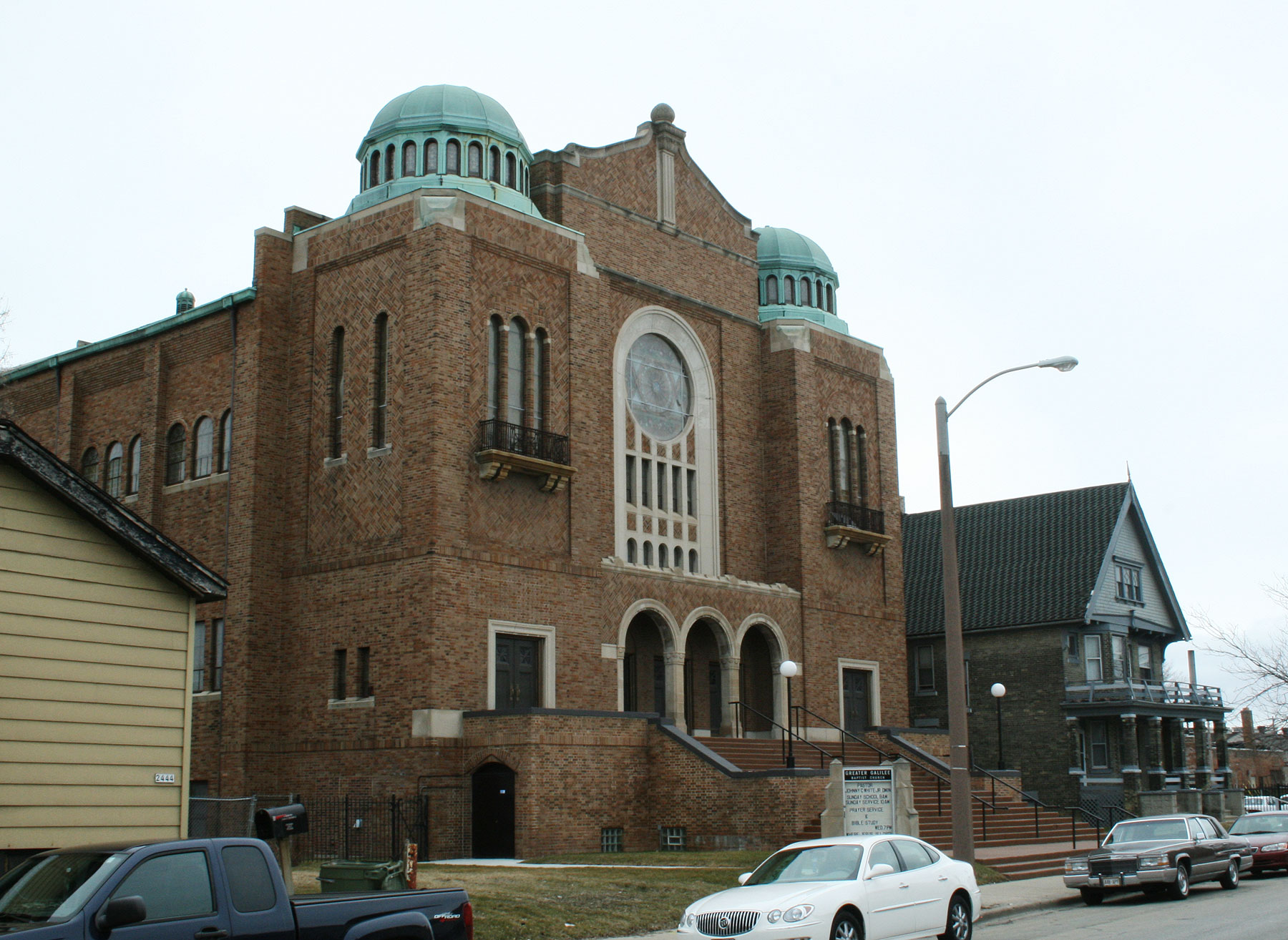
- Former synagogue, in use from 1925 to 1960
- Location: 2432 North Teutonia Avenue, Milwaukee, Wisconsin
- Coordinates: 43°03′47″N 87°55′41″W
- Architects: Bruns, Herman H.
- Website: greatergalileebaptistchurch.org
- NRHP reference No.: 92000107
- Added to NRHP: March 5, 1992

Congregation Beth Israel Ner Tamid (Hebrew: בית ישראל) is an egalitarian Conservative Jewish congregation whose synagogue is at 6880 North Green Bay Road in Glendale, a suburb north of Milwaukee, Wisconsin, in the United States.

Founded in 1884 as Congregation B'ne Jacob, the congregation split, re-amalgamated, and went bankrupt before re-organizing as Beth Israel in 1901. The synagogue building it constructed on Teutonia Avenue in 1925, and sold in 1959, was added to the National Register of Historic Places in 1992. The current building was constructed in three phases, completed in 1962, 1966, and 1980.

Solomon Scheinfeld was the congregation's first permanent rabbi, serving in 1892, and again from 1902 until his death in 1943. Herbert Panitch was rabbi from 1970 until his retirement in 1995. Jacob Herber became rabbi in 2003, and Joel Alter in 2018.

As of 2011 Beth Israel was the only synagogue in Milwaukee associated with the United Synagogue of Conservative Judaism. It then merged with Temple Beth El Ner Tamid to create Congregation Beth Israel Ner Tamid. The rabbi was Herber, and the rabbi emeritus was Panitch.

== Early years ==
In 1884 Congregation B'ne Jacob was formed in Milwaukee, Wisconsin. By 1886 it had split into two congregations, Moses Montefiore Gemeinde and Anshe Jacob. In 1891 they re-amalgamated, creating Beth Hamedrash Hagadol, and the following year hired Solomon Isaac Scheinfeld as the congregation's first permanent rabbi. Scheinfeld had been born in Lithuania in 1860, and had moved to Milwaukee soon after receiving semicha in 1890. He stayed less than a year before moving to Kentucky.

The congregation completed a new synagogue building at 462 Fifth Street in 1893, but was unable to afford the mortgage, and in 1900 the courts foreclosed on the property. The following year the congregation was re-organized as Congregation Beth Israel and re-acquired the synagogue building on Fifth Street, and in 1902 Scheinfeld was re-hired as rabbi. By 1918, the synagogue had 108 member families, and annual revenues of $7,000 (today $150,000).

Scheinfeld served as Beth Israel's rabbi until his death in 1943. During his tenure, he established a מעות חטים (maot chitim, literally "money for wheat" in Hebrew) fund to provide for the needs of Milwaukee Jews too poor to afford food for the Passover Seder. That fund continued after his death as the "Rabbi Solomon I. Scheinfeld Maoth Chitim Fund", and in 2003 distributed $20,000 worth of food to 600 families. Rabbi Harold Baumrind served until the split/move, and then became rabbi for those who continued more orthodox practices at the new Beth Hamedrosh Hagodol B'nai Sholom on 50th and Center Street for several years.

== Teutonia building ==
Beth Israel sold its Fifth Street building in 1924, and, after meeting in temporary quarters for a year, constructed a new building at 2432 North Teutonia Avenue. That new building had a rectangular footprint and gable roof, with walls of brown brick and the front flanked by two square towers with Byzantine-styled copper domes. The windows included the six-pointed Star of David. Inside, the sanctuary displayed a wooden ark on four columns, four ceremonial chairs, and the tablets of the Ten Commandments, all of which have been moved to the new synagogue.

As the Jewish community of Milwaukee migrated north to suburbs in the 1940s and 1950s, the location became inconvenient. In 1957, a 15-acre (6.1 ha) property was purchased at 6880 North Green Bay Avenue in Glendale, a suburb north of Milwaukee, and construction began on new facilities there in 1959. The Teutonia Avenue building was sold in 1959, and vacated in 1960. On March 5, 1992, it was added to the National Register of Historic Places.

The building has been used by the Greater Galilee Baptist Church as a place of Baptist Christian worship since 1961.

== Move from Orthodox to Conservative Judaism ==
Beth Israel was founded as an Orthodox synagogue, and its rabbi, Solomon Scheinfeld, also served as chief rabbi of the United Orthodox Congregations of Milwaukee. However, the congregation had done away with separate seating for men and women in 1920s or 30s; at the same time Beth Israel also instituted English language sermons. The congregation associated with the United Synagogue of Conservative Judaism, and eventually became fully egalitarian.

== 1960s to 1990s ==
Beth Israel's current facilities were built in three phases. In 1962 a new school building was completed, and the congregation began holding services there. In 1966, the sanctuary building and social hall were completed and dedicated, and in 1980 work on the sanctuary was completed.

In 1970, Herbert Panitch joined Beth Israel from Congregation Agudath Achim in Altoona, Pennsylvania. He served as rabbi until his retirement in 1995.

== Events since 2000 ==
Toronto native Mitchell Joshua Martin, a graduate of the cantorial school at the Jewish Theological Seminary of America (JTSA), joined as cantor in 2002. In August, 2008, Fortunée Belilos joined as interim cantor. The following July, the synagogue hired as cantor Jeremy Stein, who had graduated that year from the JTSA's cantorial school.

Jacob Herber became rabbi of Beth Israel in August 2003. A graduate of the University of California, Davis, he was ordained by the JTSA in 1996. Before coming to Beth Israel, he served as assistant and then senior rabbi of Philadelphia's Har Zion Temple. His rabbinate there was a subject of the book The New Rabbi by Stephen Fried. Funded by congregation members and the Milwaukee Jewish Federation, Herber traveled to Uganda in July 2008 to assist in the Abayudaya in converting to Judaism. That year the congregation had 700 member families.

Rabbi Joel Alter has served CBINT since 2018. Ordained at Jewish Theological Seminary (JTS) in New York in 1996, Rabbi Alter began his rabbinic career as a teacher, administrator, and school rabbi in Jewish day schools in DC, Baltimore, and Boston. He returned to New York to recruit new rabbis and cantors to JTS as its director of admissions, focusing on the American Jewish community's contemporary religious needs. Rabbi Alter moved to Milwaukee with his twin daughters, Ayelet and Annael, to lead a congregation for the first time.

As of 2011, Beth Israel Ner Tamid was the only synagogue in Milwaukee associated with the United Synagogue of Conservative Judaism. Currently, the rabbi is Joel Alter, the cantor is Jeremy Stein, and the president is Menachem Graupe.
