= Eugen Täubler =

German historian (1879–1953)

Eugen Täubler (10 October 1879 – 13 August 1953) was a German historian.

== Life ==
Born on 10 October 1879, in Gostyń, he studied history in Berlin under Otto Hirschfeld, receiving his doctorate in 1904 with a dissertation titled Die Parthernachrichten bei Josephus. From 1910 to 1914, he worked as a lecturer at the Hochschule für die Wissenschaft des Judentums (Higher Institute for Jewish Studies) in Berlin.

In 1927, he married the historian Selma Stern, who was a research fellow at the Akademie für die Wissenschaft des Judentums at the time.

From 1922 to 1925, he taught classes at the University of Zurich, and in the years 1925 to 1933 was a professor of ancient history at the University of Heidelberg. In 1933, he was removed from his position at Heidelberg by the Nazis, and returned to teach at the Hochschule für die Wissenschaft des Judentums. After the institute's forced closure in 1941, Täubler and his wife emigrated to the United States with the help of Julian Morgenstern, president of Hebrew Union College in Cincinnati. There, he became a professor at Hebrew Union College in Cincinnati until his death in 1953. Täubler's wife, Selma Stern-Täubler, served as the first archivist at the American Jewish Archives which were established there in 1947.

== Selected publications ==
- Untersuchungen zur Geschichte des Decemvirats und der Zwölftafeln (Studies on the history of Decemvirate and the Twelve Tables), 1921.
- Die Vorgeschichte des zweiten punischen Krieges (The prehistory of the Second Punic War), 1921.
- Die Archaeologie des Thukydides (The Archaeology of Thucydides), 1927.
- Tyche (Tyche).
- Der römische Staat (The Roman State).
