= Selma Stern =

German historian (1890–1981)

Selma Stern-Täubler
- Selma Stern-Täubler by Jack Warner, c. 1950
- Born: Selma Stern; 24 July 1890; Kippenheim, Grand Duchy of Baden, German Empire
- Died: 17 August 1981 (aged 91); Basel, Switzerland
- Occupation: Historian
- Known for: Historical works on the history of German-speaking Jews
- Spouse: Eugen Taubler

Selma Stern-Täubler (born 24 July 1890, Kippenheim, Germany – died 17 August 1981, Basel) was one of the first women to become a professional historian in Germany, and the author of a seven-volume work (3,740 pages) The Prussian State and the Jews, her opus magnum.

Stern used the quotation "What man understands he is able to withstand" in the introductions to several of her books.

== Life ==
Selma Stern grew up in an upper-middle-class Jewish family; her father was a physician. In 1901, the family moved to Baden-Baden. In 1904, she was the first girl to attend the Großherzogliches Badisches Gymnasium, a boys' highschool, from which she graduated in 1908. She studied history, philosophy and philology at Heidelberg University, but left after three semesters and graduated at Ludwig-Maximilians-Universität München in 1913 on Anacharsis Cloots. In 1914, she moved to Frankfurt to live with her mother and sister and started a career in German-Jewish history on a freelance basis.

Shortly after the founding of the Akademie für die Wissenschaft des Judentums in Berlin in 1919, Stern accepted an invitation to become one of its research fellows in 1920. There, she began work on the first two volumes of Der preussische Staat und die Juden, a study of Jewry under Frederick William I of Prussia, published in 1925. In 1927, Stern received her doctorate and married the director and founder of the academy, the historian Eugen Täubler. In 1936, the Täublers moved to England in the hope of preserving the academy's work in exile, but returned to Germany the following year.

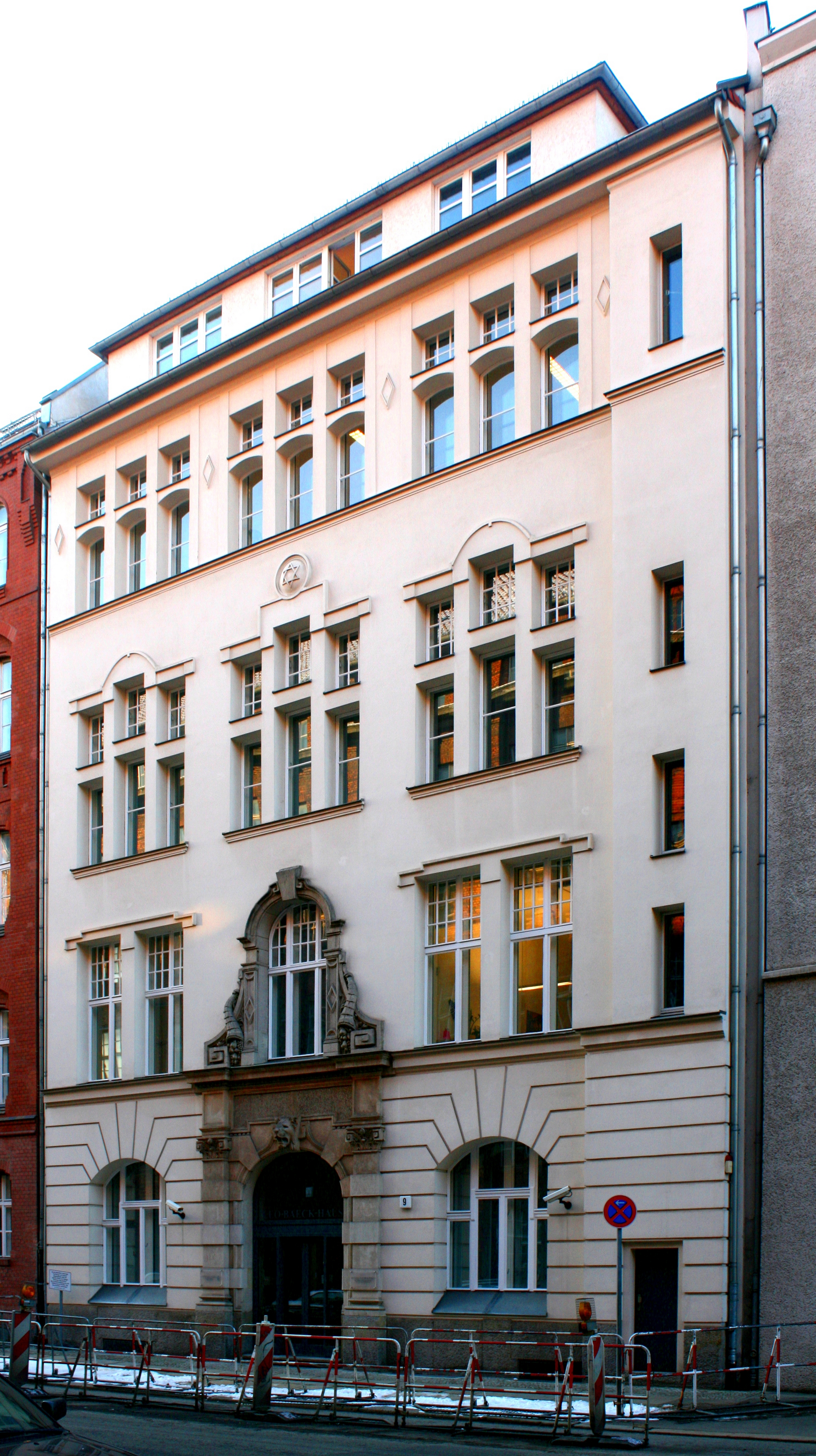
The quondam building of the Hochschule für die Wissenschaft des Judentums at Tucholskystraße 9 in Berlin (since 1999 named Leo-Baeck-Haus and seat of the Central Council of Jews in Germany)

In 1938, one of the volumes was ready for publication, but under Nazi persecution the publisher's stock, together with her manuscript and numerous supporting documents, was destroyed during Kristallnacht. Stern was not allowed to visit any public libraries or archives, but got help from several scholars to finish her work. In the introduction of Der preussische Staat und die Juden Stern mentions that one copy, dealing with the Jews under Frederick the Great, was saved by an anonymous female employee of Schocken Verlag), who came to their apartment in Charlottenburg at the end of November 1938.

When Stern and Täubler fled to the United States in 1941 on one of the last ships to leave Europe before the United States entered the war, the Nazi authorities allowed her to take with her the only surviving copy of the manuscript. First they lived in New York; from 1947 to 1955, she was in charge of Jewish-American Archives at Hebrew Union College-Jewish Institute of Religion in Cincinnati, where she worked as an archivist. Stern became a widow in 1953 without having children. In 1955, she retired and was involved in founding the Leo Baeck Institute.

In 1960, Stern moved to Basel, where her sister lived. Between 1961 and 1972, she published Der preußische Staat und die Juden, fully documented. Topics covered include quotas of Jews or Jewish families (Schutzjuden), bank ownership, the minting activities by the court Jews Veitel Heine Ephraim and Daniel Itzig and their trade in silver and debased coins during and after the Seven Years' War, interest, taxes and fees. In 1974, a complete index was published with the help of three co-workers.

== Selected works ==
- Anacharsis Cloots, der Redner des Menschengeschlechts. Ein Beitrag zur Geschichte der Deutschen in der Französischen Revolution. Kraus Reprint, Vadut 1965 (EA Berlin 1914, zugl. Dissertation Universität München 1914).
- Karl Wilhelm Ferdinand. Herzog zu Braunschweig und Lüneburg. Lax, Hildesheim 1921.
- Jud Süß. Ein Beitrag zur deutschen und jüdischen Geschichte. Müller Verlag, München 1973 (unaltered new ed., Berlin 1929).
- with Ludwig Lewisohn (trans.). The Spirit Returneth: a novel. Philadelphia: Jewish Publication Society of America, 1946.
- The Court Jew; a contribution to the history of the period of absolutism in Central Europe. Philadelphia: Jewish Publication Society of America, 1950. Full text online at archive.org
- Der preußische Staat und die Juden. Mohr, Tübingen 1962 (7 vols.) 1. Teil: Die Zeit des Großen Kurfürsten und Friedrichs I. 2 Abteilungen: Darstellung/Akten. 2. Teil: Die Zeit Friedrich Wilhelms I. 2 Abteil. 3. Teil. Die Zeit Friedrichs des Großen. 2 Abt.: Darstellung/Akten in 2 Halbbänden. 4. Teil. Gesamtregister.
- Josel of Rosheim, commander of Jewry in the Holy Roman Empire of the German nation. 1st ed. Philadelphia: Jewish Publication Society of America, 1965. Translated by Gertrude Hirschler. 1965.
- Ihr seid meine Zeugen. Ein Novellenkranz aus der Zeit des Schwarzen Todes 1348/19. Müller Verlag, München 1972.
