= Manfred Swarsensky =

German-American rabbi

Manfred Erich Swarsensky (October 22, 1906 in Marienfließ in Pomerania – November 10, 1981 in Madison, Wisconsin) was a German-American rabbi.

== Biography ==
Born in Marienfließ in Pomerania (renamed Marianowo after 1945), Prussia, Swarsensky gained a PhD from the Higher Institute for Jewish Studies in Berlin in 1929. He became a liberal Rabbi with Jüdische Gemeinde zu Berlin, the Jewish unity congregation comprising the bulk of Jewish faithful in Berlin and combining Jews of mainstream (also called liberal, in today's English terminology 'conservative'), Orthodox and Reform affiliation. In 1938 the Nazis burned his preferred synagogue on Prinzregentenstraße and imprisoned him in Sachsenhausen concentration camp.

In February 1940 Swarsensky emigrated to the United States. For the next thirty-six years he worked as Rabbi for Temple Beth El, a Reform synagogue in Madison, Wisconsin. He married Ida Weiner (January 22, 1918 – June 15, 2010) in 1952 and had two children. Swarsensky died of cancer at the University of Wisconsin Hospital on November 10, 1981.

The Manfred E. Swarsensky Humanitarian Service Award, awarded for outstanding voluntary contributions on behalf of race relations, women's health, conservation or public service, is named after him and is awarded annually by the Rotary Club of Madison, of which Rabbi Swarsensky was a member. Rabbi Swarsensky also served as Chair of Jewish Learning while teaching at Edgewood College.

== Bibliography ==
- Mensch: Biography and Writings of Manfred Eric Swarsensky, Marvin Zolot, Edgewood College Press, 2009
