= Temple Beth El (Madison, Wisconsin) =

Reform synagogue, founded 1939

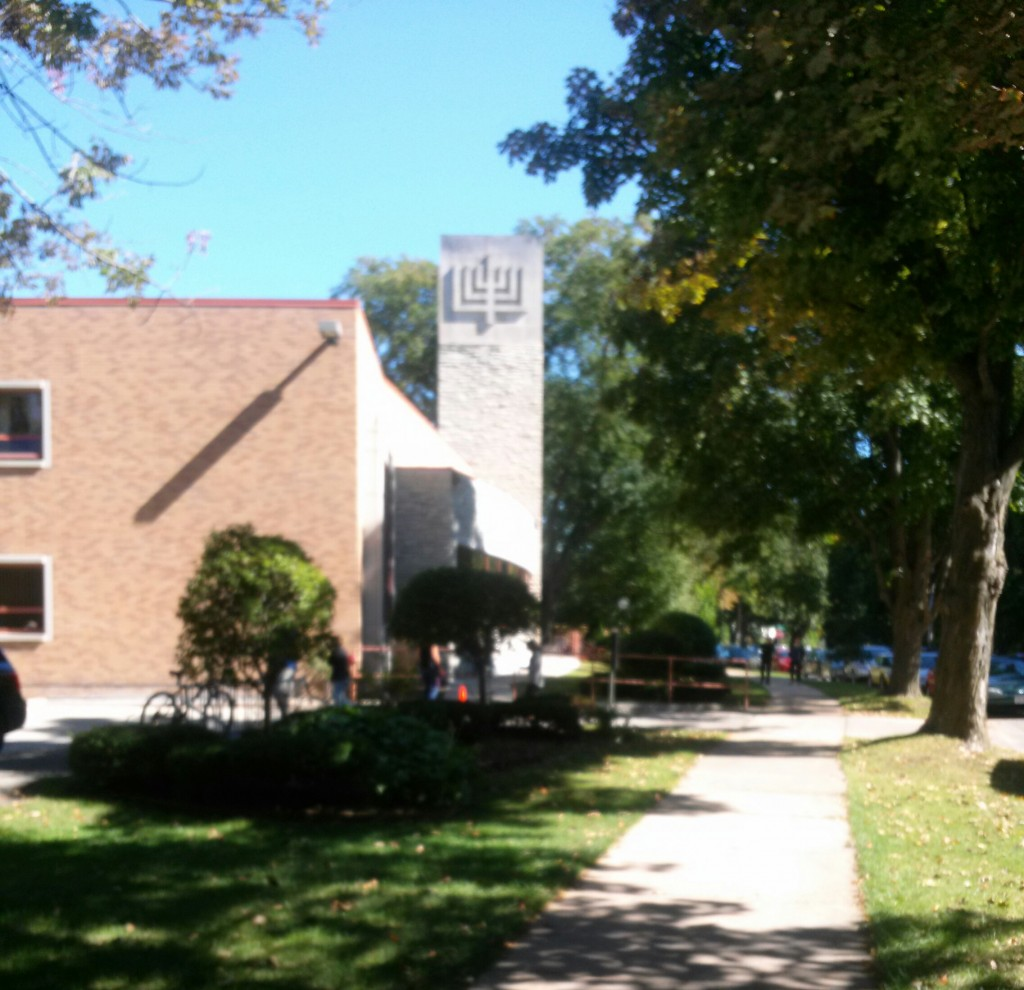
- Exterior of Temple Beth El

- Location in Wisconsin

Religion
- Affiliation: Reform Judaism
- Ecclesiastical or organisational status: Synagogue
- Leadership: Rabbi Jonathan Prosnit
- Status: Active

Location
- Location: Madison, Wisconsin
- Country: United States
- Coordinates: 43°03′23″N 89°25′44″W

Architecture
- Established: 1939 (as a congregation)
- Completed: 1950

Website
- templebethelmadison.org

Temple Beth El, also known as Temple Beth-El, is a Reform Jewish congregation and synagogue, located in Madison, Wisconsin, in the United States. The congregation was founded in 1939.

== History ==
The synagogue's founding rabbi was Dr. Manfred Swarsensky. He was a Holocaust survivor who emigrated from Berlin, Germany, to the United States in 1939, established the synagogue with 12 members, and was the rabbi of Temple Beth El for 36 years, until his retirement.

In 1950, when the synagogue had 150–200 families as members, it built the present synagogue building on land it had purchased on Arbor Drive, and dedicated the new building. By the end of Swarsensky's tenure, the synagogue had 400 families as members. The synagogue after his death created in his honor an annual lectureship, known as the "Swarsensky Weekend".

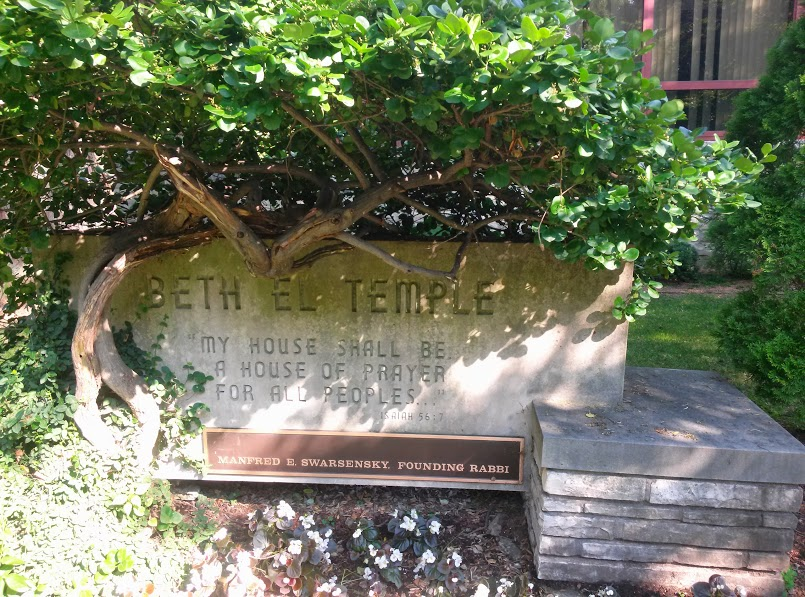
Sign located near the entrance of Temple Beth El

Rabbi Kenneth Roseman, who has a Ph.D. in Jewish history, was the rabbi of the synagogue following Swarsensky, from 1976 to 1985. He was followed by Rabbi Jan Brahms, who served for nineteen years before deciding in 2004 to take a post at a smaller congregation in The Woodlands, Texas. Brahms was known for his interfaith activities and for his many columns on religious topics for The Capital Times newspaper. During Brahms' tenure the congregation grew from 480 families to about 700. After Brahms, Daryl Crystal served as rabbi on an interim basis until Rabbi Jonathan Biatch took the position in 2005. Biatch held the position for 19 years, before becoming rabbi emeritus in 2024, and the current rabbi, Jonathan Prosnit, took Biatch's place.

Lawrence Kohn served as education director for 35 years, starting in 1979. Henry James Cargas was the first Rabbi Manfred Swarsensky Scholar at the synagogue, in 1982.

In 2008, the Madison Jewish Community Day School opened in rented space at Temple Beth El. Beginning in February 2014, the synagogue hosted Beth Israel Center's after-school services while renovations were underway at Beth Israel for six months. The synagogue had to postpone a planned group trip to Israel scheduled for August 2014 due to fighting in Israel. Rabbi Biatch said: "There's a great deal of disappointment. But there is optimism that we will go eventually."

In 2014, the synagogue had 650 member families. The congregation is a member of the Union for Reform Judaism. Its members reflect Madison's demographic as the seat of state and county government, home of the University of Wisconsin, and a regional center for medical care, scientific research, and business.

== Notable members ==
- Gabe Carimi, a former National Football League player
