= Der Morgen (magazine) =

Der Morgen was a German-Jewish literary magazine published in Berlin from April 1925 to October 1938. It was initially published bimonthly and then monthly. The magazine was founded by Julius Goldstein in the hopes of advancing the "spiritual destiny of German Jewry". Its content included essays, articles, stories, poems, and book reviews, mostly by German-Jewish intellectuals. The content covered a diverse range of topics including philosophy, history, psychology, religion, and politics. Until 1933, when heavy government censorship was instituted, articles in Der Morgen often addressed Nazi ideology and antisemitism. In November 1938, all Jewish publications were liquidated by the Nazi government and Der Morgen ceased publication.
