= Mikveh of Cologne =

Ritual Jewish bath in Cologne, Germany

- Kölner Mikwe (German)
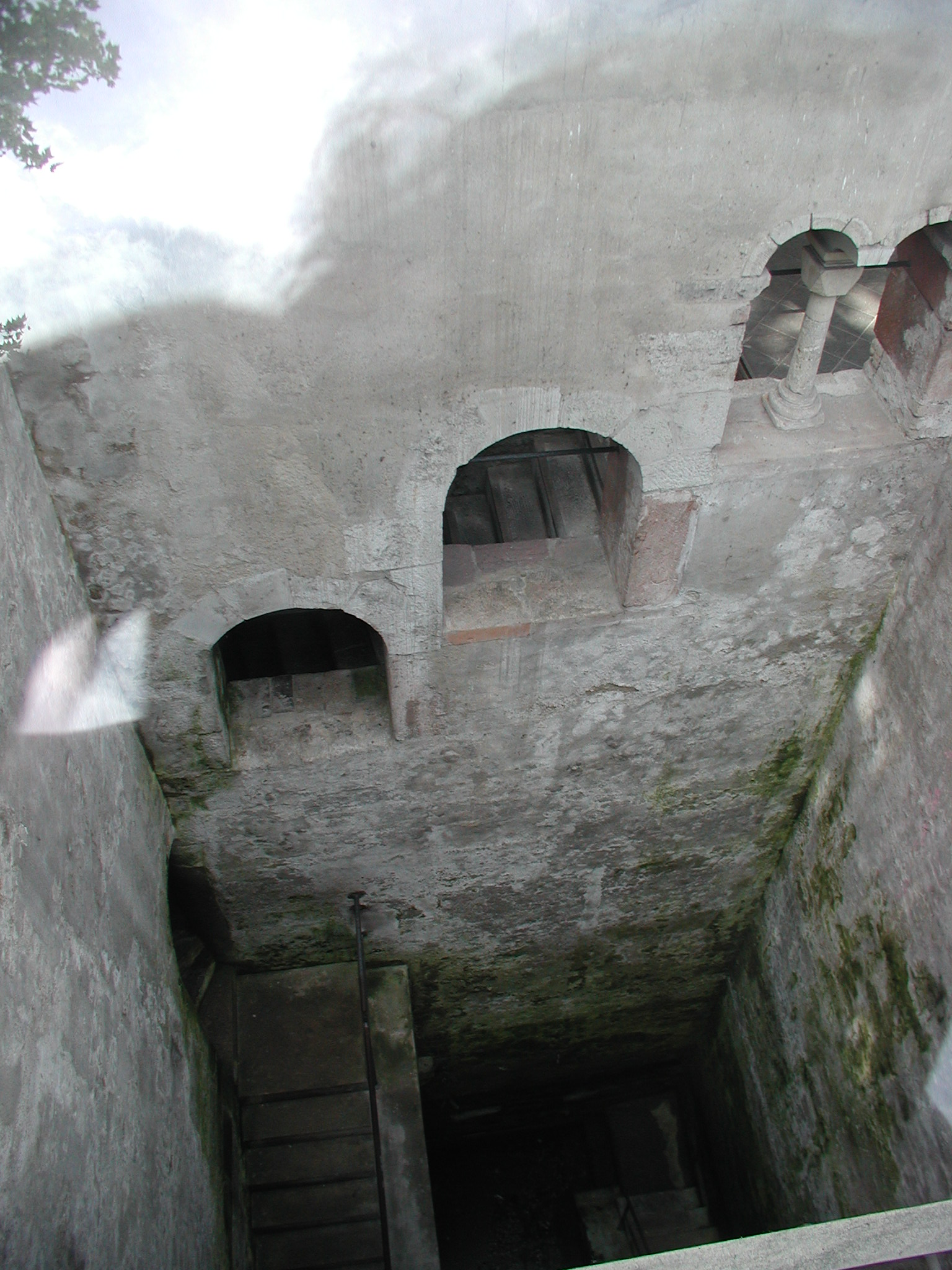
- View of the shaft from above
- Interactive map of Mikveh of Cologne
- Type: Mikvah (Jewish ritual bath)

The Mikveh of Cologne is a historical Jewish ritual bath in the German city of Cologne. It was the mikveh of the medieval Jewish community.

== History ==
The medieval Jewish community of Cologne was one of the oldest and most important Jewish communities in the territory of the Holy Roman Empire. The mikveh was located on what is now the Town Hall Square. The first construction phase of the mikveh dates back to the 8th century, but later the building was renewed and renovated several times, for example at the beginning of the 12th century. The Cologne mikveh first appeared in documents in 1270 as Puteus Judaerorum (Jewish well). Even after the expulsion of the Jews in 1424, the mikveh was still mentioned as Kaltenborn (cold well), although it was filled in before 1426.

== Rediscovery ==
Floor plan of the mikveh

During excavations conducted by Otto Doppelfeld in 1956, the mikveh and synagogue were rediscovered. In 1990, a steel and glass pyramid was added as a skylight, but due to the resulting unfavorable climatic conditions, it had to be removed in 2007. Between 2010 and 2012, new excavations around the mikveh yieldied numerous new findings.

== Gallery ==
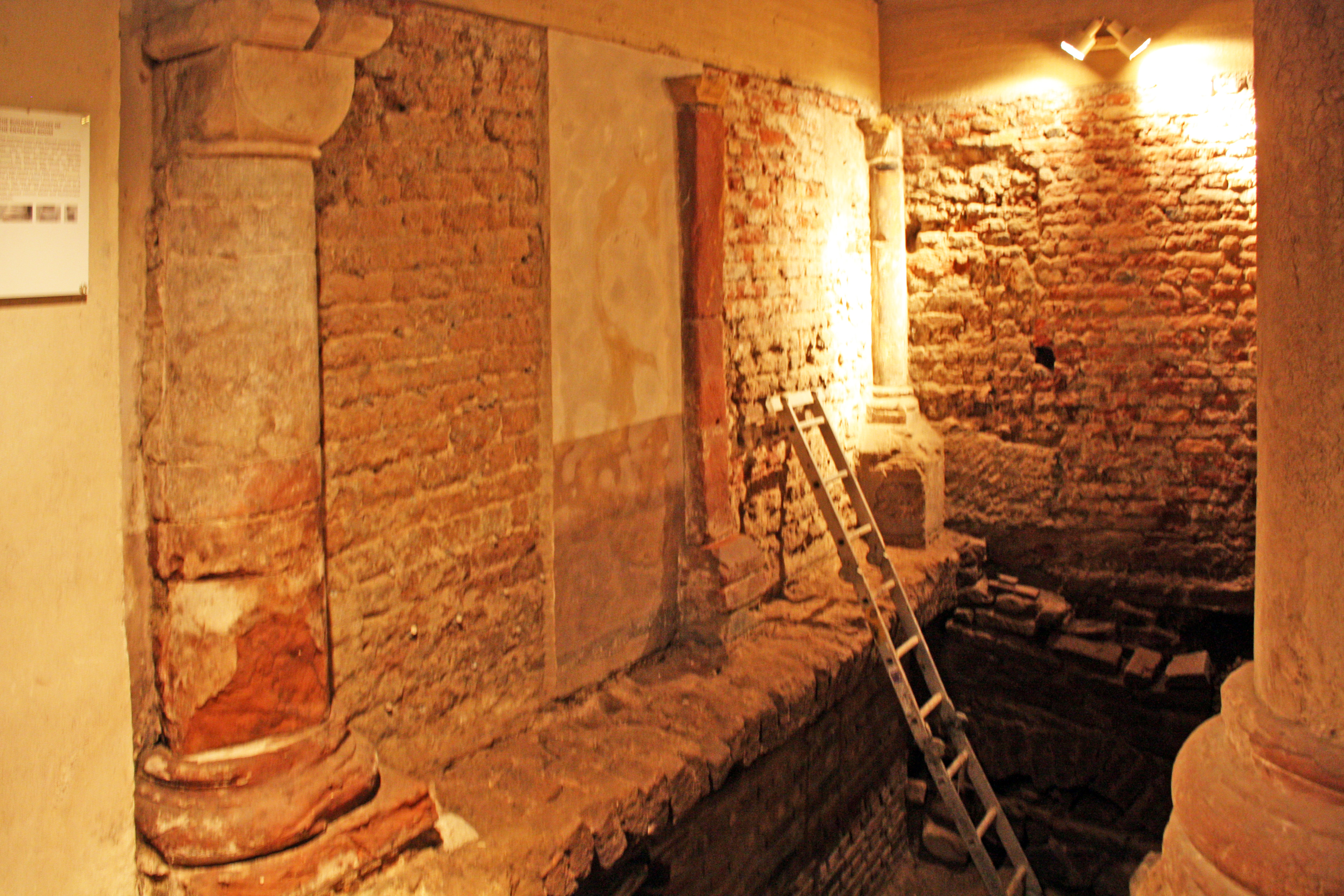
Entrance and adjacent excavation area

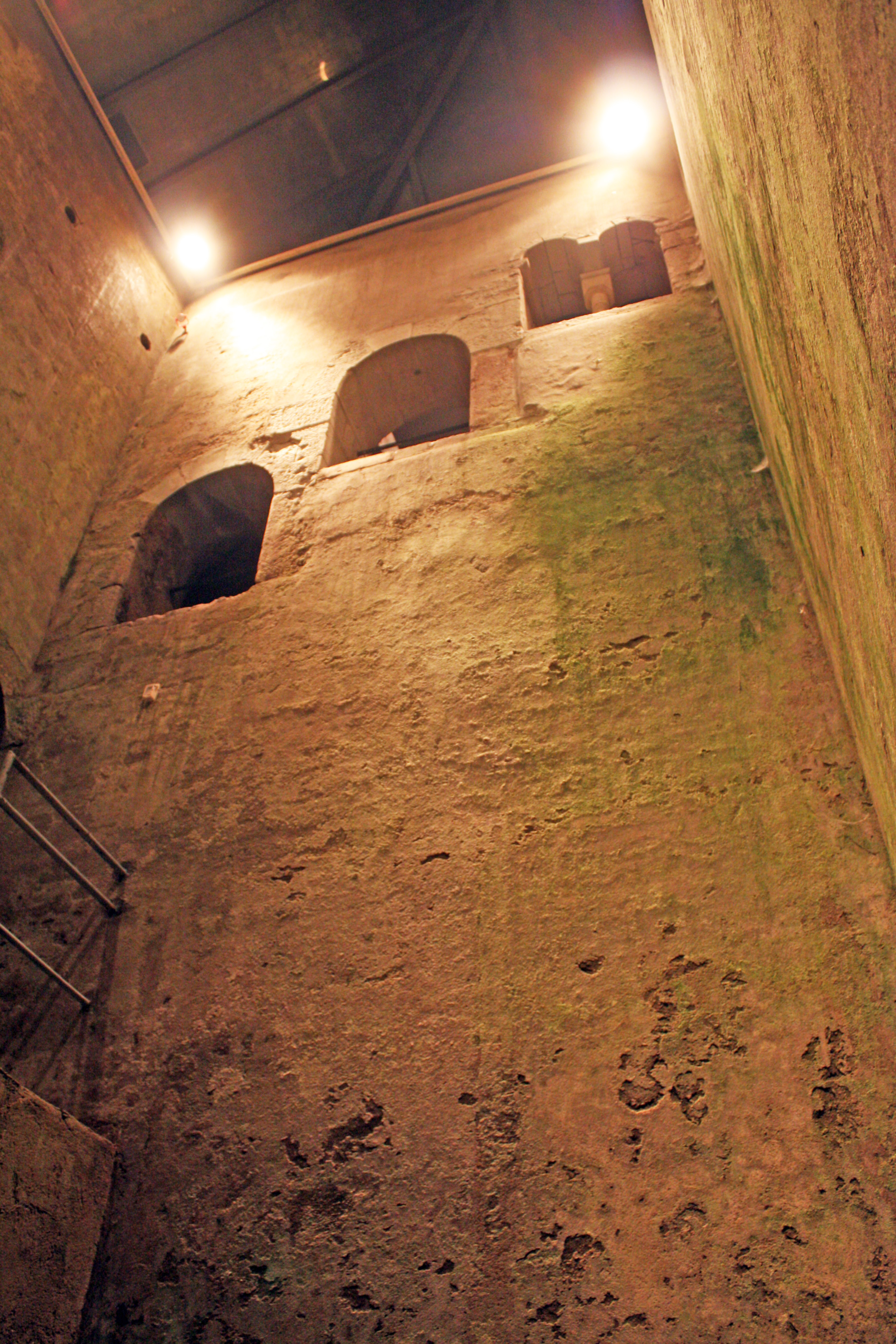
Upper shaft

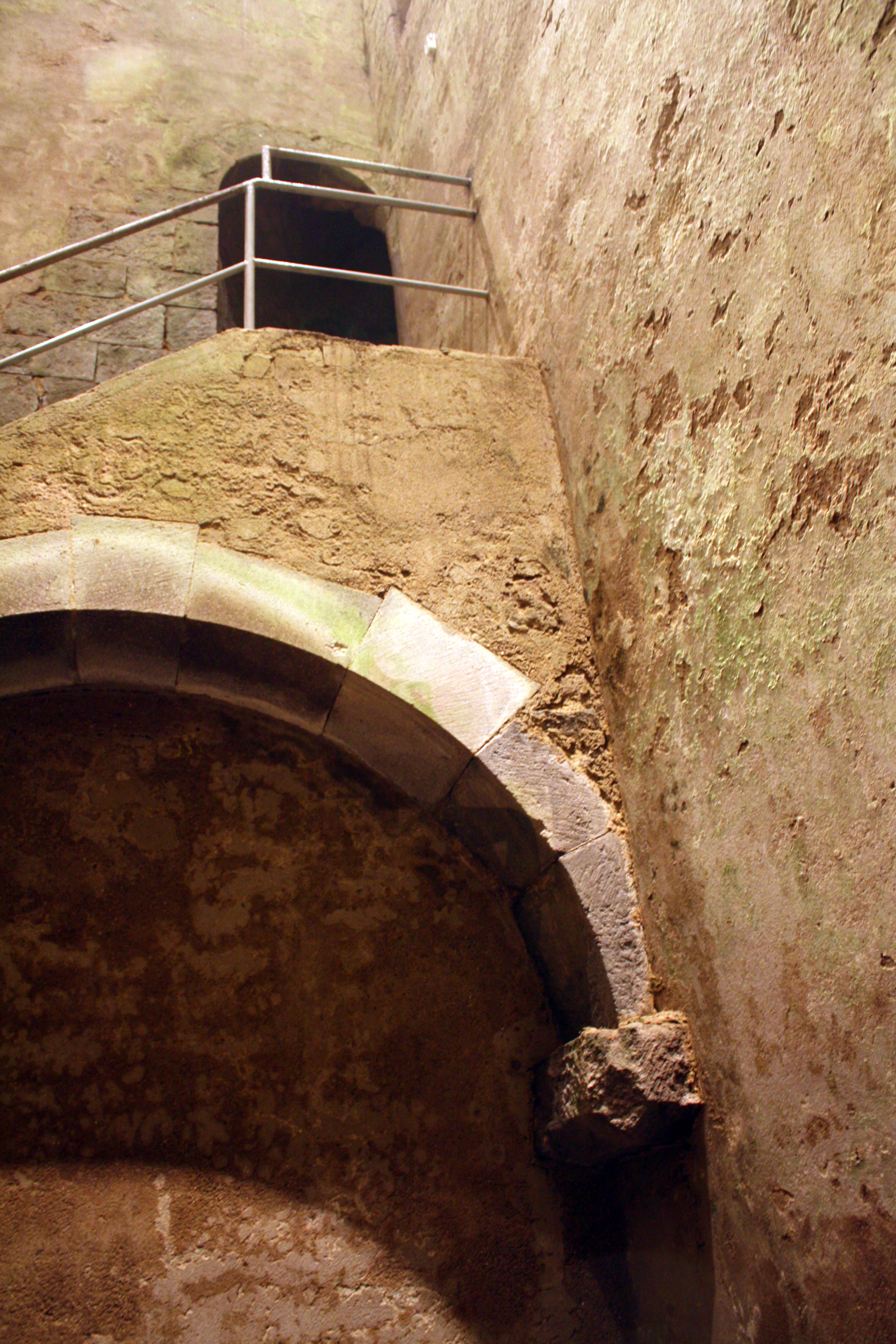
Round arch detail

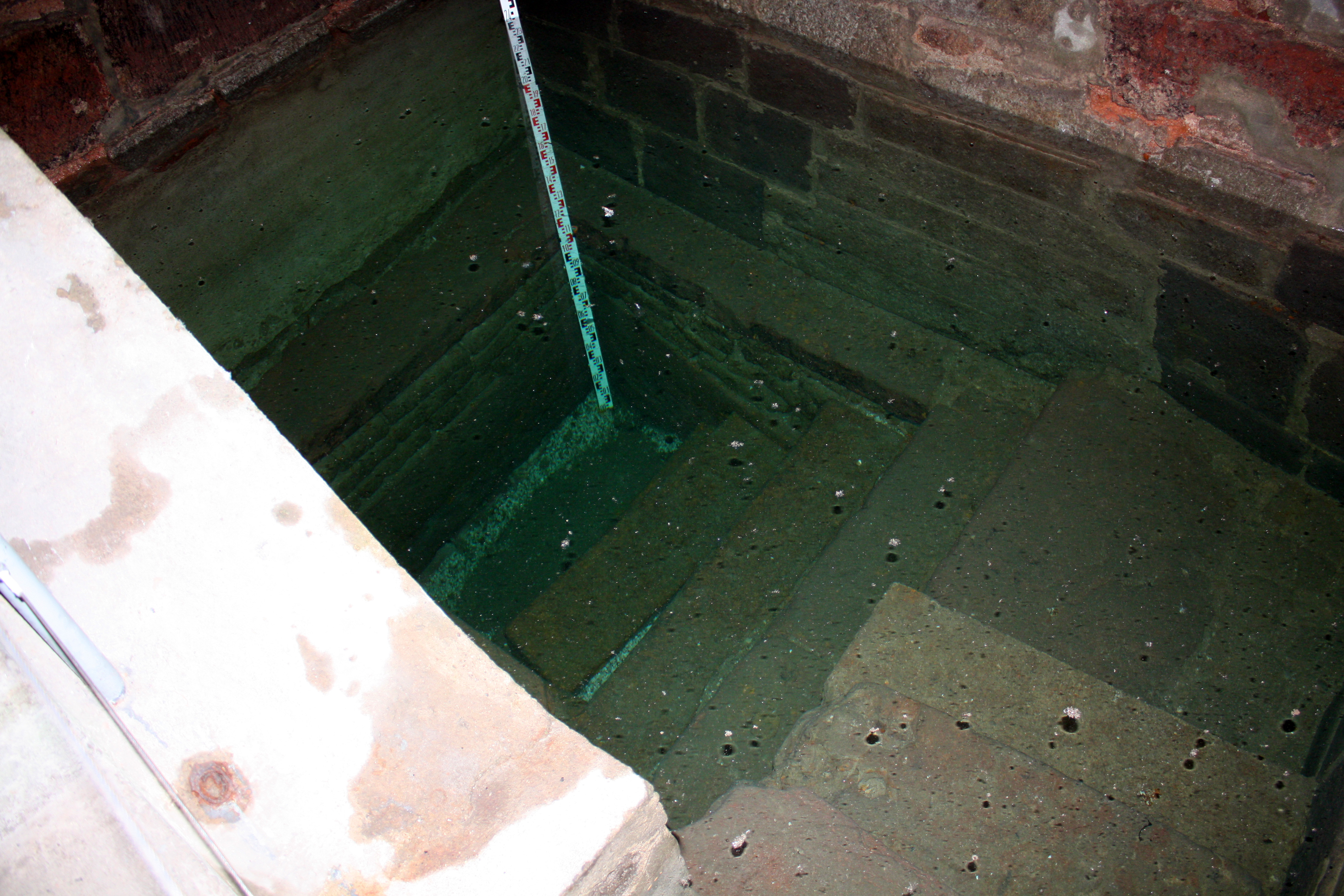
Basin and current water level measurement

== See also ==
- History of the Jews in Germany

== Bibliography ==
- Otto Doppelfeld: Die Ausgrabungen im Kölner Judenviertel, in: Zvi Asaria (editor): Die Juden in Köln von den ältesten Zeiten bis zur Gegenwart. Cologe 1959, pp. 71–145.
- Isabel Haupt: Der Vorplatz des Kölner Rathauses, in: Bauten und Orte als Träger der Erinnerung. Zurich 2000.
- Sven Schütte and Marianne Gechter: Köln: Archäologische Zone / Jüdisches Museum. Von der Ausgrabung zum Museum – Kölner Archäologie zwischen Rathaus und Praetorium. Ergebnisse und Materialien 2006–2012. 2nd edition, 2012. ISBN 978-3-9812541-0-5
