= History of the Jews in Germany =

German Jews Deutsche Juden (German) יְהוּדִים גֶּרְמָנִים (Hebrew) דײַטשע ייִדן (Yiddish)
- The location of Germany (dark green) in the European Union (light green)

Total population
- 116,000 to 225,000

Regions with significant populations
- Germany; Israel, United States, Chile, Argentina, Brazil, Mexico, and the United Kingdom

Languages
- English, German, Russian, Hebrew, Yiddish, and others

Religion
- Judaism, atheism, agnosticism and others

Related ethnic groups
- Ashkenazi Jews, Sephardi Jews, Mizrahi Jews, Israelis

The history of the Jews in Germany goes back at least to the year 321 AD, and continued through the Early Middle Ages (5th to 10th centuries AD) and High Middle Ages (c. 1000–1299 AD) when Jewish immigrants from France founded the Ashkenazi Jewish community. The community survived under Charlemagne, but suffered during the Crusades. Accusations of well poisoning during the Black Death (1346–1353) led to mass slaughter of German Jews, while others fled in large numbers to Poland. The Jewish communities of the cities of Mainz, Speyer and Worms became the center of Jewish life during medieval times. "This was a golden age as area bishops protected the Jews, resulting in increased trade and prosperity."

The First Crusade began an era of persecution of Jews in Germany. Entire communities, like those of Trier, Worms, Mainz and Cologne, were slaughtered. The Hussite Wars became the signal for renewed persecution of Jews. The end of the 15th century was a period of religious hatred that ascribed to Jews all possible evils. With Napoleon's fall in 1815, growing nationalism resulted in increasing repression. From August to October 1819, pogroms that came to be known as the Hep-Hep riots took place throughout Germany. During this time, many German states stripped Jews of their civil rights. As a result, many German Jews began to emigrate.

From the time of Moses Mendelssohn until the 20th century, the community gradually achieved emancipation, and then prospered.

In January 1933, roughly 530,000 Jews lived in Germany. After the Nazis took power and implemented their antisemitic ideology and policies, the Jewish community was increasingly persecuted. About 60% (numbering around 306,000) emigrated during the first six years of the Nazi dictatorship. In 1933, persecution of the Jews became an official Nazi policy. In 1935 and 1936, the pace of antisemitic persecution increased. In 1936, Jews were banned from all professional jobs, effectively preventing them from participating in education, politics, higher education and industry. On 9 November 1938, the state police and Nazi paramilitary forces orchestrated the Night of Broken Glass (Kristallnacht), in which the storefronts of Jewish shops and offices were smashed and vandalized, and many synagogues were destroyed by fire. Only roughly 214,000 Jews were left in Germany proper (1937 borders) on the eve of World War II.

Beginning in late 1941, the remaining community was subjected to systematic deportations to ghettos and, ultimately, to death camps in Eastern Europe. In May 1943, Germany was declared judenrein (clean of Jews; also judenfrei: free of Jews). By the end of the war, an estimated 160,000 to 180,000 German Jews had been killed by the Nazi regime and their collaborators. A total of about six million European Jews were murdered under the direction of the Nazis, in the genocide that later came to be known as the Holocaust.

After the war, the Jewish community in Germany started to slowly grow again. Beginning around 1990, a spurt of growth was fueled by immigration from the former Soviet Union, so that at the turn of the 21st century, Germany had the only growing Jewish community in Europe, and the majority of German Jews were Russian-speaking. By 2018, the Jewish population of Germany had leveled off at 126,000, not including non-Jewish members of households; the total estimated enlarged population of Jews living in Germany, including non-Jewish household members, was close to 225,000.

By German law, denial of the Holocaust or that six million Jews were murdered in the Holocaust (§ 130 StGB) is a criminal act; violations can be punished with up to five years of prison. In 2006, on the occasion of the World Cup held in Germany, the then-Interior Minister of Germany Wolfgang Schäuble, urged vigilance against far-right extremism, saying: "We will not tolerate any form of extremism, xenophobia, or antisemitism." In spite of Germany's measures against these groups and antisemites, a number of incidents have occurred in recent years.

== From Roman rule to the Crusades ==
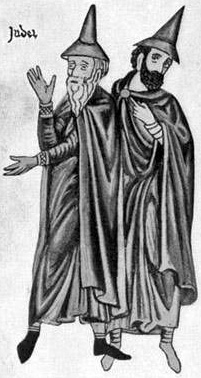
Jews wearing the pileus cornutus depicted c. 1185 in the Hortus deliciarum of the Abbess Herrad of Landsberg

Jewish migration from Roman Italy is considered the most likely source of the first Jews on German territory. There were Jews in Rome as early as 139 BC. While the date of the first settlement of Jews in the regions which the Romans called Germania Superior, Germania Inferior, and Magna Germania is not known, the first authentic document relating to a large and well-organized Jewish community in these regions dates from 321 AD and refers to Cologne on the Rhine. It indicates that the legal status of the Jews there was the same as elsewhere in the Roman Empire. They enjoyed some civil liberties, but were restricted regarding the dissemination of their culture, the keeping of non-Jewish slaves, and the holding of office under the government.

Jews were otherwise free to follow any occupation open to indigenous Germans and were engaged in agriculture, trade, industry, and gradually money-lending. These conditions at first continued in the subsequently established Germanic kingdoms under the Burgundians and Franks, for ecclesiasticism took root slowly. The Merovingian rulers who succeeded to the Burgundian empire were devoid of fanaticism and gave scant support to the efforts of the Church to restrict the civic and social status of the Jews.

Charlemagne (800–814) readily made use of the Roman Catholic Church for the purpose of infusing coherence into the loosely joined parts of his extensive empire, but was not by any means a blind tool of the canonical law. He employed Jews for diplomatic purposes, sending, for instance, a Jew as interpreter and guide with his embassy to Harun al-Rashid. Yet, even then, a gradual change occurred in the lives of the Jews. The Church forbade Christians to be usurers, so the Jews secured the remunerative monopoly of money-lending. This decree caused a mixed reaction of people in general in the Carolingian Empire (including Germany) to the Jews: Jewish people were sought everywhere, as well as avoided. This ambivalence about Jews occurred because their capital was indispensable, while their business was viewed as disreputable. This curious combination of circumstances increased Jewish influence, and Jews went about the country freely, settling also in the eastern portions (Old Saxony and Duchy of Thuringia). Aside from Cologne, where an 8th century mikveh exists, the earliest communities were established in Mainz, Worms, Speyer, Regensburg, and Aachen.

The status of the German Jews remained unchanged under Charlemagne's successor, Louis the Pious. Jews were unrestricted in their commerce; however, they paid somewhat higher taxes into the state treasury than did the non-Jews. A special officer, the Judenmeister, was appointed by the government to protect Jewish privileges. The later Carolingians, however, followed the demands of the Church more stringently. The bishops continually argued at the synods for including and enforcing decrees of the canonical law, with the consequence that the majority Christian populace mistrusted the Jewish populace. This feeling, among both princes and people, was further stimulated by the attacks on the civic equality of the Jews. Beginning with the 10th century, Holy Week increasingly became a period of antisemitic activities. Jews in Germany could read and understand the Hebrew prayers and the Bible in the original text. Halakhic studies began to flourish about 1000.

At that time, Rav Gershom ben Judah was teaching at Metz and Mainz, gathering about him pupils from far and near. He is described in Jewish historiography as a model of wisdom, humility, and piety, and became known to succeeding generations as the "Light of the Exile". In highlighting his role in the religious development of Jews in the German lands, The Jewish Encyclopedia (1901–1906) draws a direct connection to the great spiritual fortitude later shown by the Jewish communities in the era of the Crusades:

He first stimulated the German Jews to study the treasures of their religious literature. This continuous study of the Torah and the Talmud produced such a devotion to Judaism that the Jews considered life without their religion not worth living; but they did not realize this clearly until the time of the Crusades, when they were often compelled to choose between life and faith.

=== Cultural and religious centre of European Jewry ===
ShUM Sites of Speyer, Worms and Mainz
UNESCO World Heritage Site
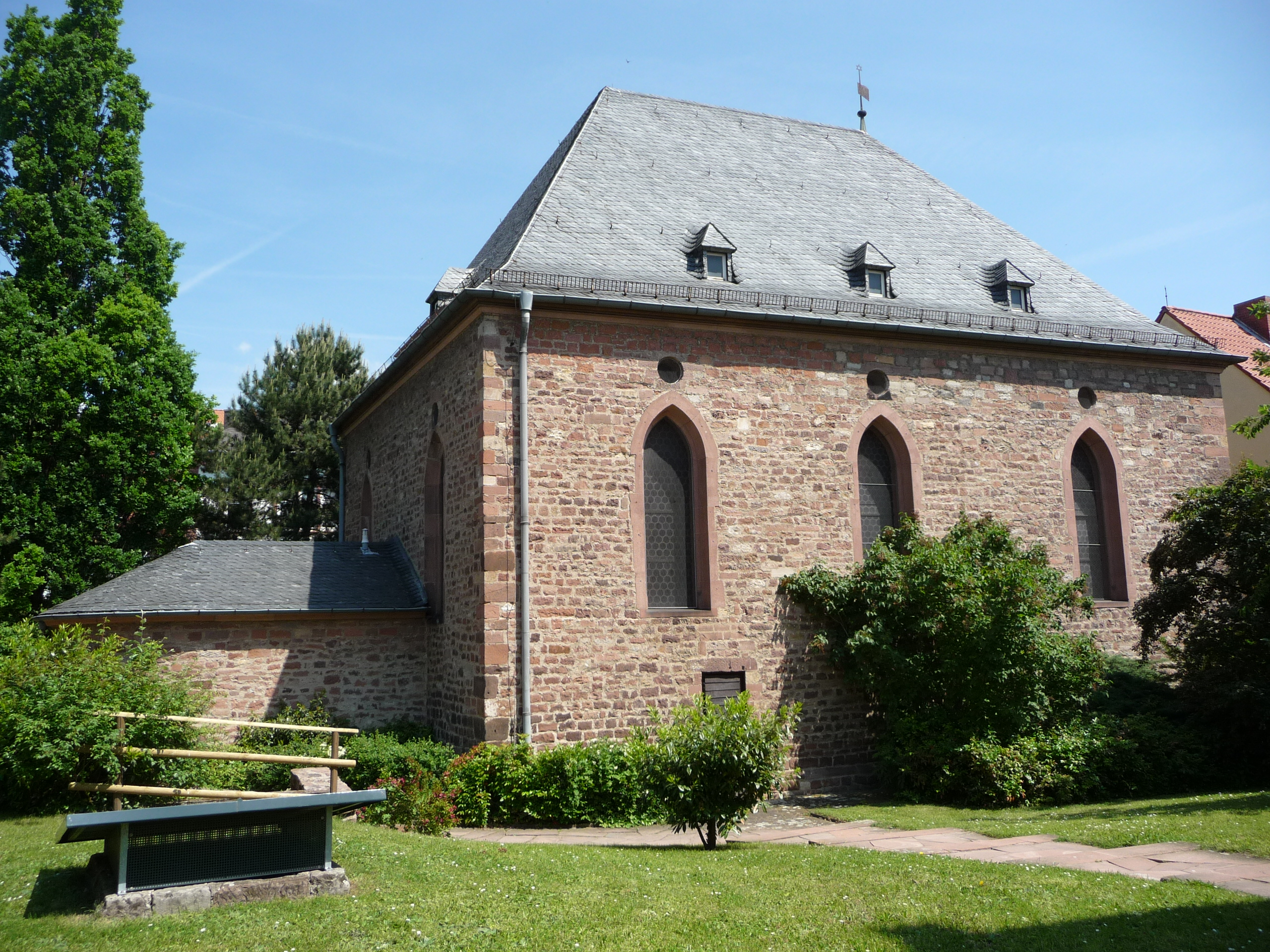
- Worms Synagogue
- Criteria: Cultural: ii, iii, vi
- Reference: 1636
- Inscription: 2021 (44th Session)
- Website: Official website

The Jewish communities of the cities of Speyer, Worms, and Mainz formed the league of cities which became the center of Jewish life during medieval times. These are referred to as the ShUM cities, after the first letters of the Hebrew names: Shin for Speyer (Shpira), Waw for Worms (Varmaisa) and Mem for Mainz (Magentza). The Takkanot Shum (Hebrew: תקנות שו״ם "Enactments of ShUM") were a set of decrees formulated and agreed upon over a period of decades by their Jewish community leaders. The official website for the city of Mainz states:

One of the most glorious epochs in Mainz's long history was the period from the beginning of the 900s and evidently much earlier. Following the barbaric Dark Ages, a relatively safe and enlightened Carolingian period brought peace and prosperity to Mainz and much of central–western Europe. For the next 400 years, Mainz attracted many Jews as trade flourished. The greatest Jewish teachers and rabbis flocked to the Rhine. Their teachings, dialogues, decisions, and influence propelled Mainz and neighboring towns along the Rhine into world-wide prominence. Their fame spread, rivaling that of other post-Diaspora cities such as Baghdad. Western European – Ashkenazic or Germanic – Judaism became centered in Mainz, breaking free of the Babylonian traditions. A Yeshiva was founded in the 10th century by Gershom ben Judah.

Historian John Man describes Mainz as "the capital of European Jewry", noting that Gershom ben Judah "was the first to bring copies of the Talmud to Western Europe" and that his directives "helped Jews adapt to European practices." Gershom's school attracted Jews from all over Europe, including the famous biblical scholar Rashi; and "in the mid-14th century, it had the largest Jewish community in Europe: some 6,000." "In essence," states the City of Mainz web site, "this was a golden age as area bishops protected the Jews resulting in increased trade and prosperity."

== A period of massacres (1096–1349) ==
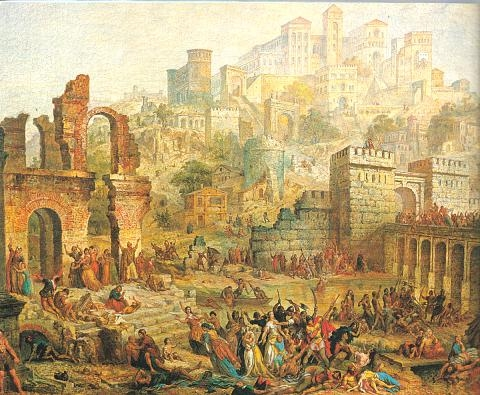
Mobs of French and German Crusaders led by Peter the Hermit ravaged Jewish communities in Speyer, Worms, and Mainz during the Rhineland massacres of 1096.

The First Crusade began an era of persecution of Jews in Germany, especially in the Rhineland. The communities of Trier, Worms, Mainz, and Cologne, were attacked. The Jewish community of Speyer was saved by the bishop, but 800 were slain in Worms. About 12,000 Jews are said to have perished in the Rhenish cities alone between May and July 1096. Alleged crimes, like desecration of the host, ritual murder, poisoning of wells, and treason, brought hundreds to the stake and drove thousands into exile.

Jews were alleged to have caused the inroads of the Mongols, though they suffered equally with the Christians. Jews suffered intense persecution during the Rintfleisch massacres of 1298. In 1336 Jews from Alsace were subjected to massacres by the outlaws of Arnold von Uissigheim.

When the Black Death swept over Europe in 1348–49, some Christian communities accused Jews of poisoning wells. Compared to the south and west of the Holy Roman Empire, the persecutions appear to have brought less drastic effects in the eastern parts of the Holy Roman Empire. Nonetheless, in the Erfurt Massacre of 1349, the members of the entire Jewish community were murdered or expelled from the city, due to superstitions about the Black Death. Many persecutions were clearly favoured by a royal throne crisis and the Wittelsbach-Luxembourg dualism, therefore recent German research proposed the term “Thronkrisenverfolgungen” (throne crisis persecutions). Royal policy and public ambivalence towards Jews helped the persecuted Jews fleeing to the East from the German-speaking lands to form the foundations of what would become the largest Jewish community in all of Europe.

== In the Holy Roman Empire ==
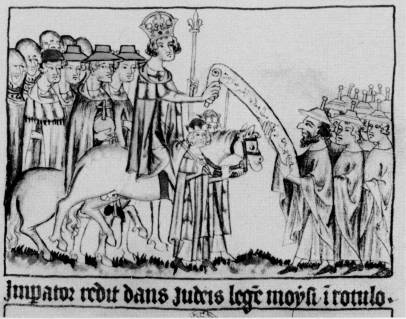
Holy Roman Emperor Henry VII meeting Jews in Rome, 1312

Arriving from France, the Low Countries and Spain, the legal and civic status of the Jews underwent a transformation under the Holy Roman Empire. Jewish people found a certain degree of protection with the Holy Roman Emperor, who claimed the right of possession and protection of all the Jews of the empire. A justification for this claim was that the Holy Roman Emperor was the successor of the emperor Titus, who was said to have acquired the Jews as his private property. The German emperors apparently claimed this right of possession more for the sake of taxing the Jews than of protecting them.

A variety of such taxes existed. Louis IV, Holy Roman Emperor, was a prolific creator of new taxes. In 1342, he instituted the "golden sacrificial penny" and decreed that every year all the Jews should pay the emperor one kreutzer out of every florins of their property in addition to the taxes they were already paying to both the state and municipal authorities. The emperors of the House of Luxembourg devised other means of taxation. They turned their prerogatives in regard to the Jews to further account by selling at a high price to the princes and free towns of the empire the valuable privilege of taxing and fining the Jews. Charles IV, via the Golden Bull of 1356, granted this privilege to the seven electors of the empire when the empire was reorganized in 1356.

From this time onward, for reasons that also apparently concerned taxes, the Jews of Germany gradually passed in increasing numbers from the authority of the emperor to that of both the lesser sovereigns and the cities. For the sake of sorely needed revenue, the Jews were now invited, with the promise of full protection, to return to those districts and cities from which they had shortly before been expelled. However, as soon as Jewish people acquired some property, they were again plundered and driven away. These episodes thenceforth constituted a large portion of the medieval history of the German Jews (and also elsewhere in Europe). Emperor Wenceslaus was particularly skilled at transferring gold from wealthier Jews to his own coffers. He entered compacts with many cities, estates, and princes whereby he annulled all outstanding debts to the Jews in return for a certain sum paid to him. Emperor Wenceslaus declared that anyone helping Jews with the collection of their debts, in spite of this annulment, would be dealt with as a robber and peacebreaker, and be forced to make restitution. This decree, which is believed to have impaired the public availability of credit was also reported to have impoverished thousands of Jewish families near the close of the 14th century.

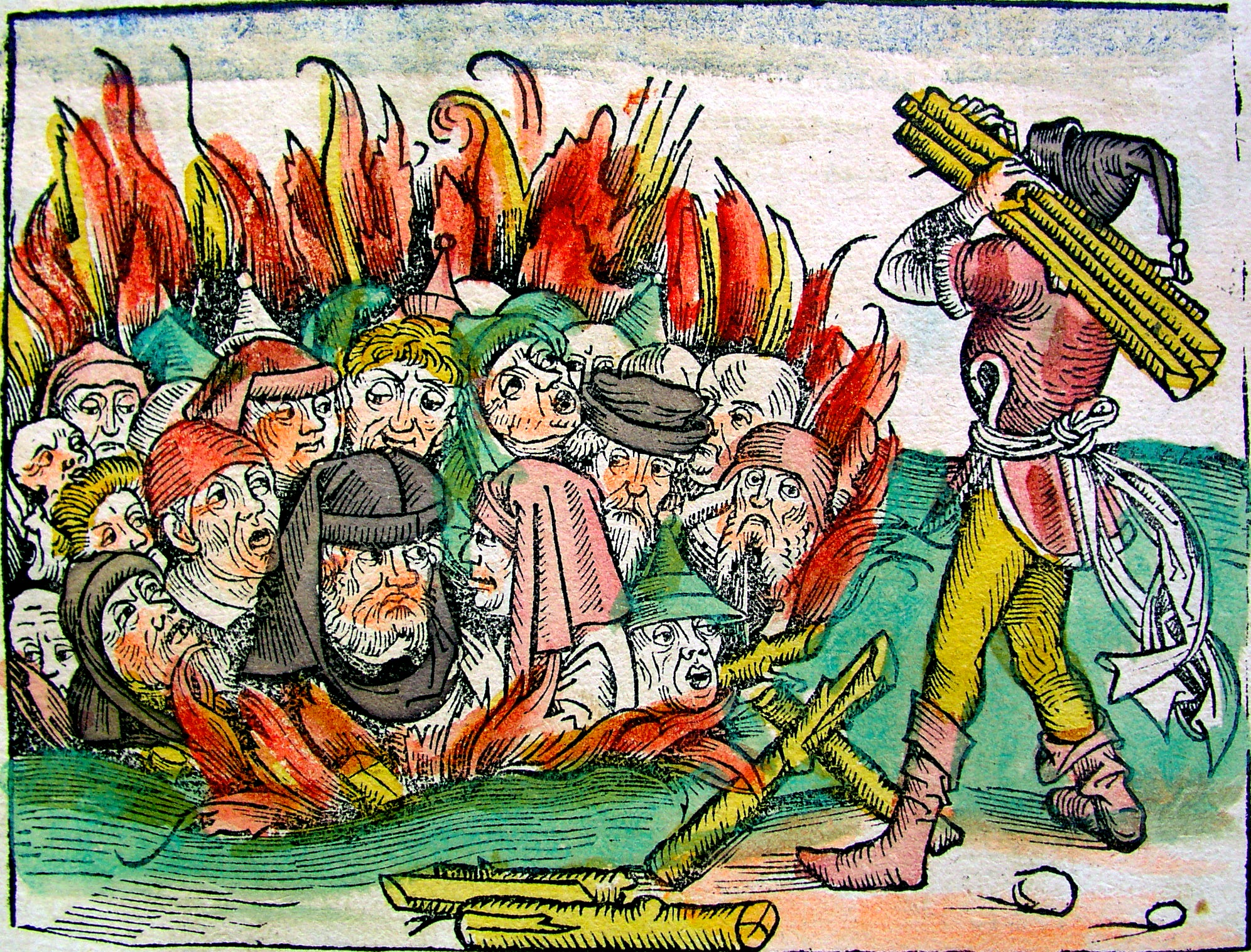
Jews burned alive for the alleged host desecration in Deggendorf, Bavaria, in 1338, and in Sternberg, Mecklenburg, in 1492; a woodcut from the Nuremberg Chronicle (1493)

The 15th century did not bring any amelioration. What happened in the time of the Crusades happened again. The war upon the Hussites became the signal for renewed persecution of Jews. The Jews of Austria, Bohemia, Moravia, and Silesia passed through all the terrors of death, forced baptism, or voluntary self-immolation for the sake of their faith. When the Hussites made peace with the Church, the Pope sent the Franciscan friar John of Capistrano to win the renegades back into the fold and inspire them with loathing for "heresy" and "unbelief"; 41 heretics were burned in Wrocław alone, and all Jews were forever banished from Silesia. The Franciscan friar Bernardine of Feltre brought a similar fate upon the communities in southern and western Germany. As a consequence of the fictitious confessions extracted under torture from the Jews of Trent, the populace of many cities, especially of Regensburg, fell upon the Jews and massacred them.

The end of the 15th century, which brought a new epoch for the Christian world, brought no relief to the Jews. Jews in Germany remained the victims of a religious hatred that ascribed to them all possible evils. When the established Church, threatened in its spiritual power in Germany and elsewhere, prepared for its conflict with the culture of the German Renaissance, one of its most convenient points of attack was rabbinic literature. At this time, as once before in France, Jewish converts spread false reports in regard to the Talmud, but an advocate of the book arose in the person of Johann Reuchlin, the German humanist, who was the first one in Germany to include the Hebrew language among the humanities. His opinion, though strongly opposed by the Dominicans and their followers, finally prevailed when the humanistic Pope Leo X permitted the Talmud to be printed in Italy.

=== Moses Mendelssohn ===
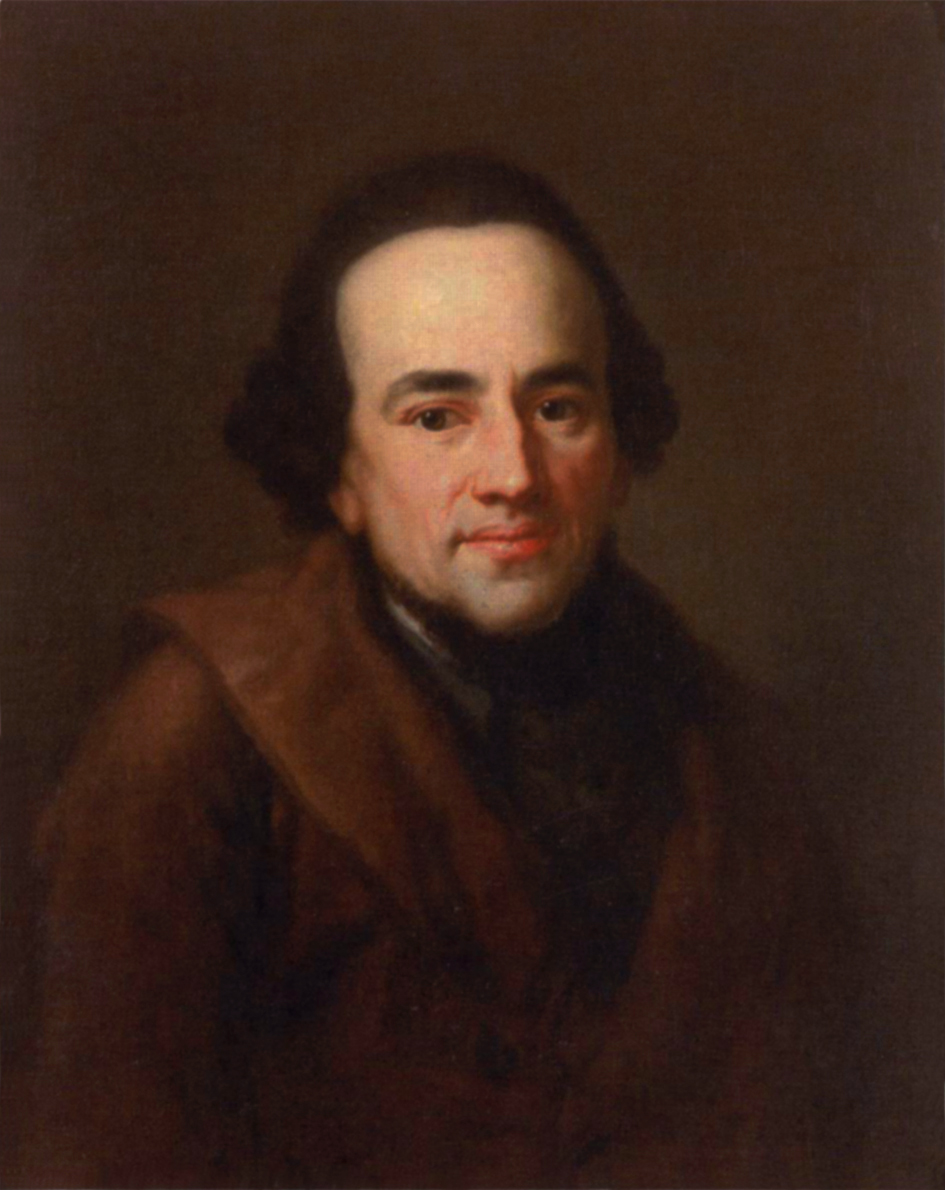
Moses Mendelssohn

Though reading German books was forbidden in the 1700s by Jewish inspectors who had a measure of police power in Germany, Moses Mendelson found his first German book, an edition of Protestant theology, at a well-organized system of Jewish charity for needy Talmud students. Mendelssohn read this book and found proof of the existence of God – his first meeting with a sample of European letters. This was only the beginning to Mendelssohn's inquiries about the knowledge of life. Mendelssohn learned many new languages, and with his whole education consisting of Talmud lessons, he thought in Hebrew and translated for himself every new piece of work he met into this language. The divide between the Jews and the rest of society was caused by a lack of translation between these two languages, and Mendelssohn translated the Torah into German, bridging the gap between the two; this book allowed Jews to speak and write in German, preparing them for participation in German culture and secular science. In 1750, Mendelssohn began to serve as a teacher in the house of Isaac Bernhard, the owner of a silk factory, after beginning his publications of philosophical essays in German. Mendelssohn conceived of God as a perfect Being and had faith in "God's wisdom, righteousness, mercy, and goodness." He argued, "the world results from a creative act through which the divine will seeks to realize the highest good," and accepted the existence of miracles and revelation as long as belief in God did not depend on them. He also believed that revelation could not contradict reason. Like the deists, Mendelssohn claimed that reason could discover the reality of God, divine providence, and immortality of the soul. He was the first to speak out against the use of excommunication as a religious threat. At the height of his career, in 1769, Mendelssohn was publicly challenged by a Christian apologist, a Zurich pastor named John Lavater, to defend the superiority of Judaism over Christianity. From then on, he was involved in defending Judaism in print. In 1783, he published Jerusalem, or On Religious Power and Judaism. Speculating that no religious institution should use coercion and emphasized that Judaism does not coerce the mind through dogma, he argued that through reason, all people could discover religious philosophical truths, but what made Judaism unique was its revealed code of legal, ritual, and moral law. He said that Jews must live in civil society, but only in a way that their right to observe religious laws is granted, while also recognizing the needs for respect, and multiplicity of religions. He campaigned for emancipation and instructed Jews to form bonds with the gentile governments, attempting to improve the relationship between Jews and Christians while arguing for tolerance and humanity. He became the symbol of the Jewish Enlightenment, the Haskalah.

Early 19th century

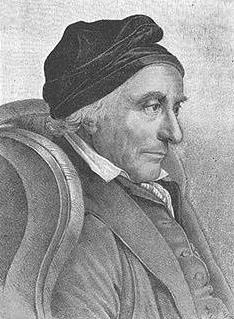
David Friedländer was a German Jewish communal leader who promoted Jewish emancipation in the Holy Roman Empire.

In the late 18th century, a youthful enthusiasm for new ideals of religious equality began to take hold in the western world. Austrian Emperor Joseph II was foremost in espousing these new ideals. As early as 1782, he issued the Patent of Toleration for the Jews of Lower Austria, thereby establishing civic equality for his Jewish subjects.

Before 1806, when general citizenship was largely nonexistent in the Holy Roman Empire, its inhabitants were subject to varying estate regulations. In different ways from one territory of the empire to another, these regulations classified inhabitants into different groups, such as dynasts, members of the court entourage, other aristocrats, city dwellers (burghers), Jews, Huguenots (in Prussia a special estate until 1810), free peasants, serfs, peddlers and Gypsies, with different privileges and burdens attached to each classification. Legal inequality was the principle.

The concept of citizenship was mostly restricted to cities, especially Free Imperial Cities. No general franchise existed, which remained a privilege for the few, who had inherited the status or acquired it when they reached a certain level of taxed income or could afford the expense of the citizen's fee (Bürgergeld). Citizenship was often further restricted to city dwellers affiliated to the locally dominant Christian denomination (Calvinism, Roman Catholicism, or Lutheranism). City dwellers of other denominations or religions and those who lacked the necessary wealth to qualify as citizens were considered to be mere inhabitants who lacked political rights, and were sometimes subject to revocable residence permits.

Most Jews then living in those parts of Germany that allowed them to settle were automatically defined as mere indigenous inhabitants, depending on permits that were typically less generous than those granted to gentile indigenous inhabitants (Einwohner, as opposed to Bürger, or citizen). In the 18th century, some Jews and their families (such as Daniel Itzig in Berlin) gained equal status with their Christian fellow city dwellers, but had a different status from noblemen, Huguenots, or serfs. They often did not enjoy the right to freedom of movement across territorial or even municipal boundaries, let alone the same status in any new place as in their previous location.

With the abolition of differences in legal status during the Napoleonic era and its aftermath, citizenship was established as a new franchise generally applying to all former subjects of the monarchs. Prussia conferred citizenship on the Prussian Jews in 1812, though this by no means resulted in full equality with other citizens. Jewish emancipation did not eliminate all forms of discrimination against Jews, who often remained barred from holding official state positions. The German federal edicts of 1815 merely held out the prospect of full equality, but it was not genuinely implemented at that time, and even the promises which had been made were modified. However, such forms of discrimination were no longer the guiding principle for ordering society, but a violation of it. In Austria, many laws restricting the trade and traffic of Jewish subjects remained in force until the middle of the 19th century in spite of the patent of toleration. Some of the crown lands, such as Styria and Upper Austria, forbade any Jews to settle within their territory; in Bohemia, Moravia, and Austrian Silesia many cities were closed to them. The Jews were also burdened with heavy taxes and imposts.

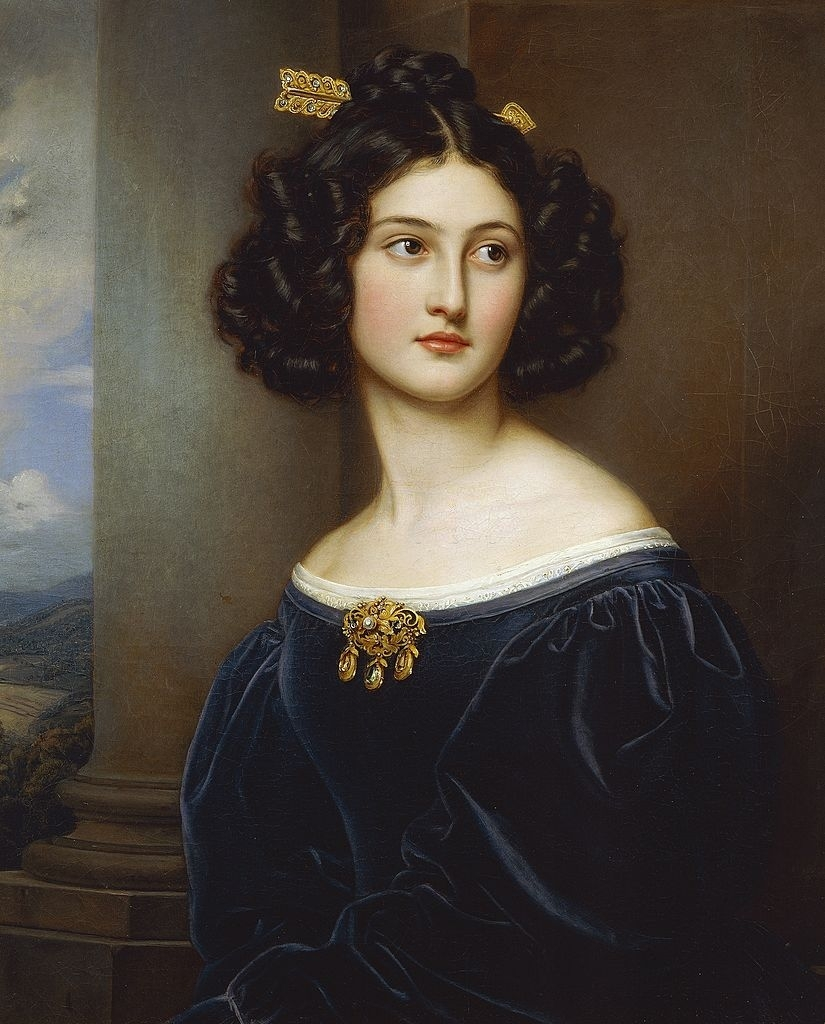
Nanette Kaulla in a painting for the Gallery of Beauties in 1829

In the German Kingdom of Prussia, the government materially modified the promises made in the disastrous year of 1813. The promised uniform regulation of Jewish affairs was time and again postponed. In the period between 1815 and 1847, no less than 21 territorial laws affecting Jews in the older eight provinces of the Prussian state were in effect, each having to be observed by part of the Jewish community. At that time, no official was authorized to speak in the name of all Prussian Jews, or Jewry in most of the other 41 German states, let alone for all German Jews.

Nevertheless, a few men came forward to promote their cause, foremost among them being Gabriel Riesser (d. 1863), a Jewish lawyer from Hamburg, who demanded full civic equality for his people. He won over public opinion to such an extent that this equality was granted in Prussia on 6 April 1848, in Hanover and Nassau on 5 September and on 12 December, respectively, and also in his home state of Hamburg, then home to the second-largest Jewish community in Germany. In Württemberg, equality was conceded on 3 December 1861; in Baden on 4 October 1862; in Holstein on 14 July 1863; and in Saxony on 3 December 1868. After the establishment of the North German Confederation by the law of 3 July 1869, all remaining statutory restrictions imposed on the followers of different religions were abolished; this decree was extended to all the states of the German empire after the events of 1870.

=== The Jewish Enlightenment ===
During the General Enlightenment (the 1600s to late 1700s), many Jewish women began to frequently visit non-Jewish salons and to campaign for emancipation. In Western Europe and the German states, observance of Jewish law, Halacha, started to be neglected. In the 18th century, some traditional German scholars and leaders, such as the doctor and author of Ma'aseh Tuviyyah, Tobias b. Moses Cohn, appreciated the secular culture. The most important feature during this time was the German Aufklärung, which was able to boast of native figures who competed with the finest Western European writers, scholars, and intellectuals. Aside from the externalities of language and dress, the Jews internalized the cultural and intellectual norms of German society. The movement, becoming known as the German or Berlin Haskalah offered many effects to the challenges of German society. As early as the 1740s, many German Jews and some individual Polish and Lithuanian Jews had a desire for secular education.

The German-Jewish Enlightenment of the late 18th century, the Haskalah, marks the political, social, and intellectual transition of European Jewry to modernity. Some of the elite members of Jewish society knew European languages. Absolutist governments in Germany, Austria, and Russia deprived the Jewish community's leadership of its authority and many Jews became 'Court Jews'. Using their connections with Jewish businessmen to serve as military contractors, managers of mints, founders of new industries and providers to the court of precious stones and clothing, they gave economic assistance to the local rulers. Court Jews were protected by the rulers and acted as did everyone else in society in their speech, manners, and awareness of European literature and ideas. Isaac Euchel, for example, represented a new generation of Jews. He maintained a leading role in the German Haskalah, is one of the founding editors of Ha-Me/assef. Euchel was exposed to European languages and culture while living in Prussian centers: Berlin and Koenigsberg. His interests turned towards promoting the educational interests of the Enlightenment with other Jews. Moses Mendelssohn as another enlightenment thinker was the first Jew to bring secular culture to those living an Orthodox Jewish life. He valued reason and felt that anyone could arrive logically at religious truths while arguing that what makes Judaism unique is its divine revelation of a code of law. Mendelssohn's commitment to Judaism leads to tensions even with some of those who subscribed to Enlightenment philosophy. Faithful Christians who were less opposed to his rationalistic ideas than to his adherence to Judaism found it difficult to accept this Juif de Berlin. In most of Western Europe, the Haskalah ended with large numbers of Jews assimilating. Many Jews stopped adhering to Jewish law, and the struggle for emancipation in Germany awakened some doubts about the future of Jews in Europe and eventually led to both immigrations to America and Zionism.

In Russia, antisemitism ended the Haskalah. Some Jews responded to this antisemitism by campaigning for emancipation, while others joined revolutionary movements and assimilated, and some turned to Jewish nationalism in the form of the Zionist Hibbat Zion movement.

=== Reorganization of the German Jewish community ===
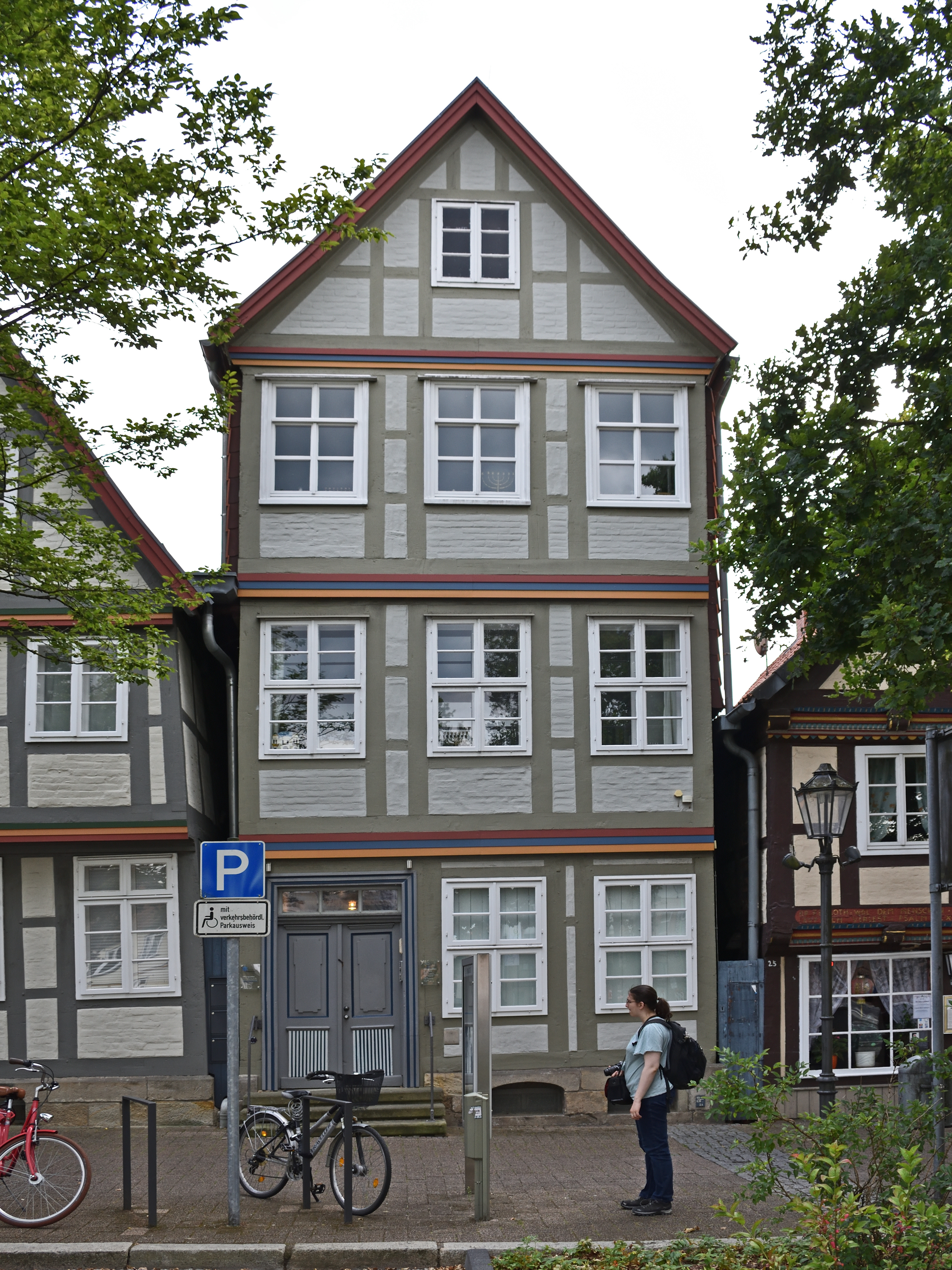
The synagogue in Celle was built in 1740 and is still in use.

Abraham Geiger and Samuel Holdheim were two founders of the conservative movement in modern Judaism who accepted the modern spirit of liberalism. Samson Raphael Hirsch defended traditional customs, denying the modern "spirit". Neither of these beliefs was followed by the faithful Jews. Zecharias Frankel created a moderate reform movement in assurance with German communities. Public worships were reorganized, reduction of medieval additions to the prayer, congregational singing was introduced, and regular sermons required scientifically trained rabbis. Religious schools were enforced by the state due to a want for the addition of religious structure to secular education of Jewish children. Pulpit oratory started to thrive mainly due to German preachers, such as M. Sachs and M. Joel. Synagogal music was accepted with the help of Louis Lewandowski. Part of the evolution of the Jewish community was the cultivation of Jewish literature and associations created with teachers, rabbis, and leaders of congregations.

Another vital part of the reorganization of the Jewish-German community was the heavy involvement of Jewish women in the community and their new tendencies to assimilate their families into a different lifestyle. Jewish women were contradicting their view points in the sense that they were modernizing, but they also tried to keep some traditions alive. German Jewish mothers were shifting the way they raised their children in ways such as moving their families out of Jewish neighborhoods, thus changing who Jewish children grew up around and conversed with, all in all shifting the dynamic of the then close-knit Jewish community. Additionally, Jewish mothers wished to integrate themselves and their families into German society in other ways. Because of their mothers, Jewish children participated in walks around the neighborhood, sporting events, and other activities that would mold them into becoming more like their other German peers. For mothers to assimilate into German culture, they took pleasure in reading newspapers and magazines that focused on the fashion styles, as well as other trends that were up and coming for the time and that the Protestant, bourgeois Germans were exhibiting. Similar to this, German-Jewish mothers also urged their children to partake in music lessons, mainly because it was a popular activity among other Germans. Another effort German-Jewish mothers put into assimilating their families was enforcing the importance of manners on their children. It was noted that non-Jewish Germans saw Jews as disrespectful and unable to grasp the concept of time and place. Because of this, Jewish mothers tried to raise their kids having even better manners than the Protestant children in an effort to combat the pre-existing stereotype put on their children. In addition, Jewish mothers put a large emphasis on proper education for their children in hopes that this would help them grow up to be more respected by their communities and eventually lead to prosperous careers. While Jewish mothers worked tirelessly on ensuring the assimilation of their families, they also attempted to keep the familial aspect of Jewish traditions. They began to look at Shabbat and holidays as less of culturally Jewish days, but more as family reunions of sorts. What was once viewed as a more religious event became more of a social gathering of relatives.

=== Birth of the Reform Movement ===
The beginning of the Reform Movement in Judaism was emphasized by David Philipson, who was the rabbi at the largest Reform congregation. The increasing political centralization of the late 18th and early 19th centuries undermined the societal structure that perpetuated traditional Jewish life. Enlightenment ideas began to influence many intellectuals, and the resulting political, economic, and social changes were overpowering. Many Jews felt a tension between Jewish tradition and the way they were now leading their lives – religiously – resulting in less tradition. As the insular religious society that reinforced such observance disintegrated, falling away from vigilant observance without deliberately breaking with Judaism was easy. Some tried to reconcile their religious heritage with their new social surroundings; they reformed traditional Judaism to meet their new needs and to express their spiritual desires. A movement was formed with a set of religious beliefs, and practices that were considered expected and tradition. Reform Judaism was the first modern response to the Jew's emancipation, though reform Judaism differing in all countries caused stresses of autonomy on both the congregation and individual. Some of the reforms were in the practices: circumcisions were abandoned, rabbis wore vests after Protestant ministers, and instrumental accompaniment was used: pipe organs. In addition, the traditional Hebrew prayer book was replaced by German text, and reform synagogues began being called temples which were previously considered the Temple of Jerusalem. Reform communities composed of similar beliefs and Judaism changed at the same pace as the rest of society had. The Jewish people have adapted to religious beliefs and practices to the meet the needs of the Jewish people throughout the generation.

== 1815–1918 ==
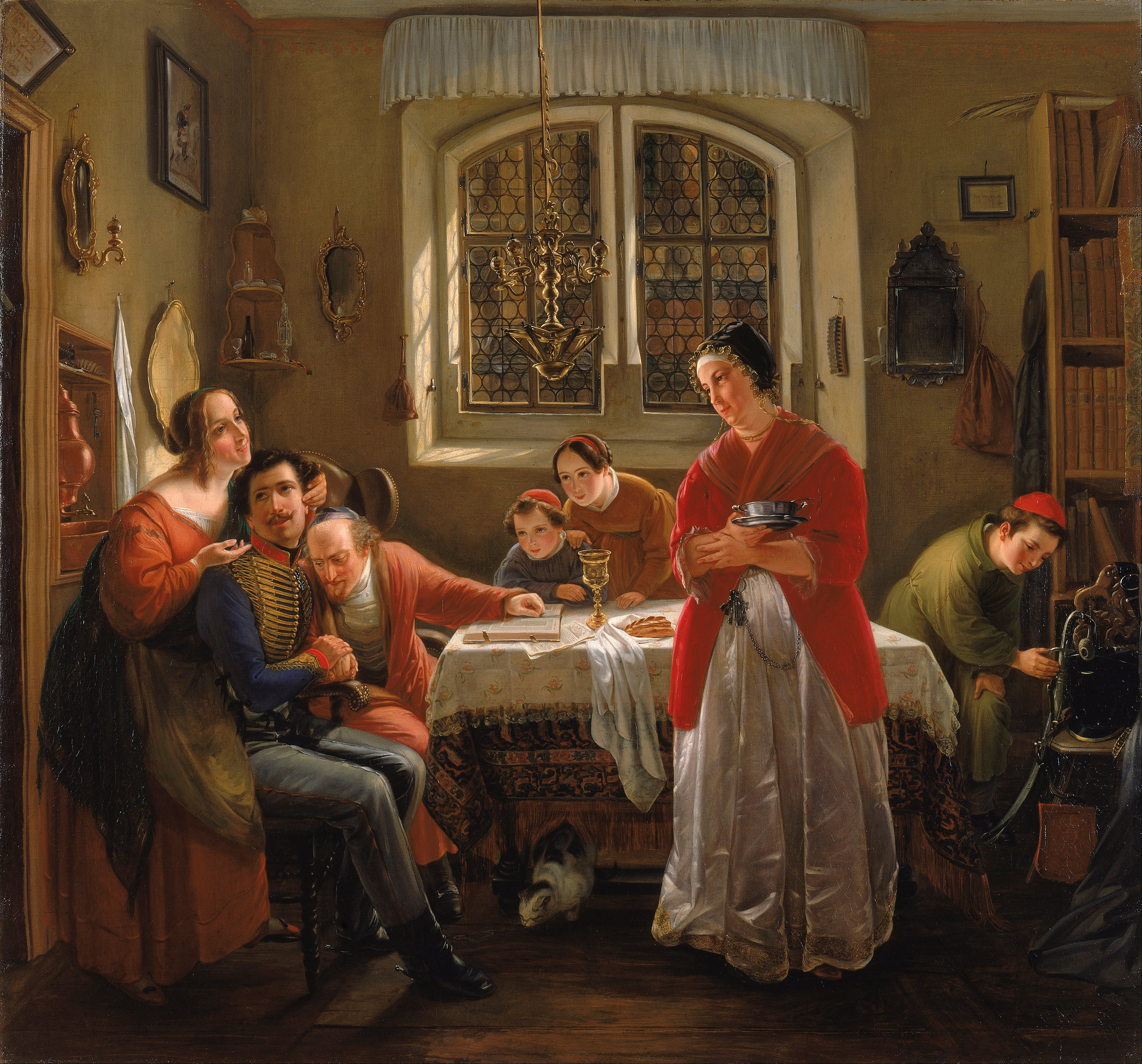
"The Return of the Volunteer from the Wars of Liberation to His Family Still Living in Accordance with Old Customs", by Moritz Daniel Oppenheim

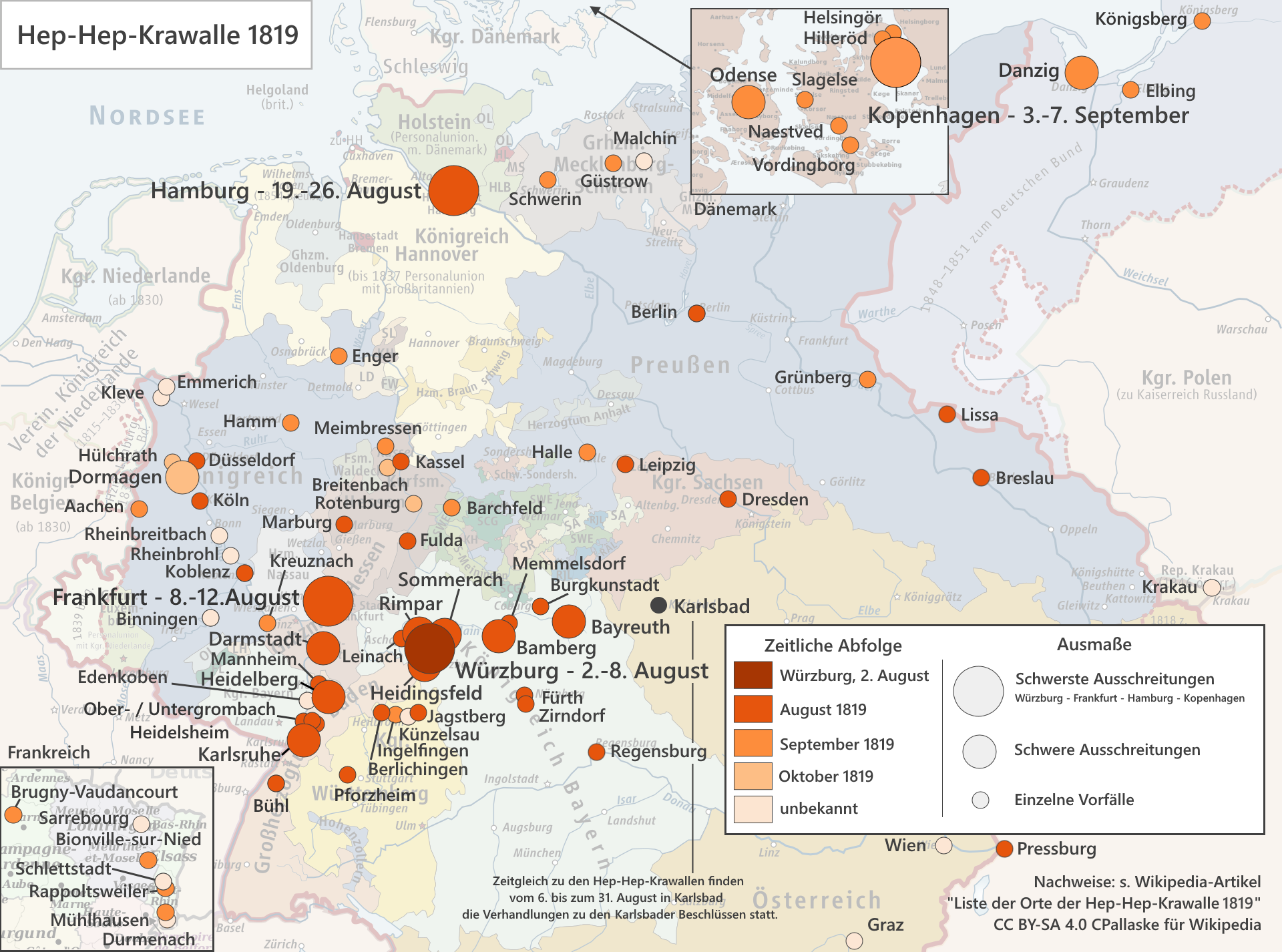
Map of the Hep-Hep riots in 1819 (German)

Napoleon I emancipated the Jews across Europe, but with Napoleon's fall in 1815, growing nationalism resulted in increasing repression. From August to October 1819, pogroms that came to be known as the Hep-Hep riots took place throughout Germany. Jewish property was destroyed in large number.

During this time, many German states stripped Jews of their civil rights. In the Free City of Frankfurt, only 12 Jewish couples were allowed to marry each year, and the 400,000 florins the city's Jewish community had paid in 1811 for its emancipation were forfeited. After the Rhineland reverted to Prussian control, Jews lost the rights Napoleon had granted them, were banned from certain professions, and the few who had been appointed to public office before the Napoleonic Wars were dismissed. Throughout numerous German states, Jews had their rights to work, settle, and marry restricted. Without special letters of protection, Jews were banned from many different professions, and often had to resort to jobs considered unrespectable, such as peddling or cattle dealing, to survive. A Jewish man who wanted to marry had to purchase a registration certificate, known as a Matrikel, proving he was in a "respectable" trade or profession. A Matrikel, which could cost up to 1,000 florins, was usually restricted to firstborn sons. As a result, most Jewish men were unable to legally marry. Throughout Germany, Jews were heavily taxed, and were sometimes discriminated against by gentile craftsmen.

As a result, many German Jews began to emigrate. The emigration was encouraged by German-Jewish newspapers. At first, most emigrants were young, single men from small towns and villages. A smaller number of single women also emigrated. Individual family members would emigrate alone, and then send for family members once they had earned enough money. Emigration eventually swelled, with some German Jewish communities losing up to 70% of their members. At one point, a German-Jewish newspaper reported that all the young Jewish males in the Franconian towns of Hagenbach, Ottingen, and Warnbach had emigrated or were about to emigrate. The United States was the primary destination for emigrating German Jews.

The Revolutions of 1848 swung the pendulum back towards freedom for the Jews. A noted reform rabbi of that time was Leopold Zunz, a contemporary and friend of Heinrich Heine. In 1871, with the unification of Germany by Chancellor Otto von Bismarck, came their emancipation, but the growing mood of despair among assimilated Jews was reinforced by the antisemitic penetrations of politics. In the 1870s, antisemitism was fueled by the financial crisis and scandals; in the 1880s by the arrival of masses of Ostjuden, fleeing from Russian territories; by the 1890s it was a parliamentary presence, threatening anti-Jewish laws. In 1879 the Hamburg pamphleteer Wilhelm Marr introduced the term 'antisemitism' into the political vocabulary by founding the Antisemitic League. Antisemites of the völkisch movement were the first to describe themselves as such, because they viewed Jews as part of a Semitic race that could never be properly assimilated into German society. Such was the ferocity of the anti-Jewish feeling of the völkisch movement that by 1900, antisemitic had entered German to describe anyone who had anti-Jewish feelings. However, despite massive protests and petitions, the völkisch movement failed to persuade the government to revoke Jewish emancipation, and in the 1912 Reichstag elections, the parties with völkisch-movement sympathies suffered a temporary defeat.

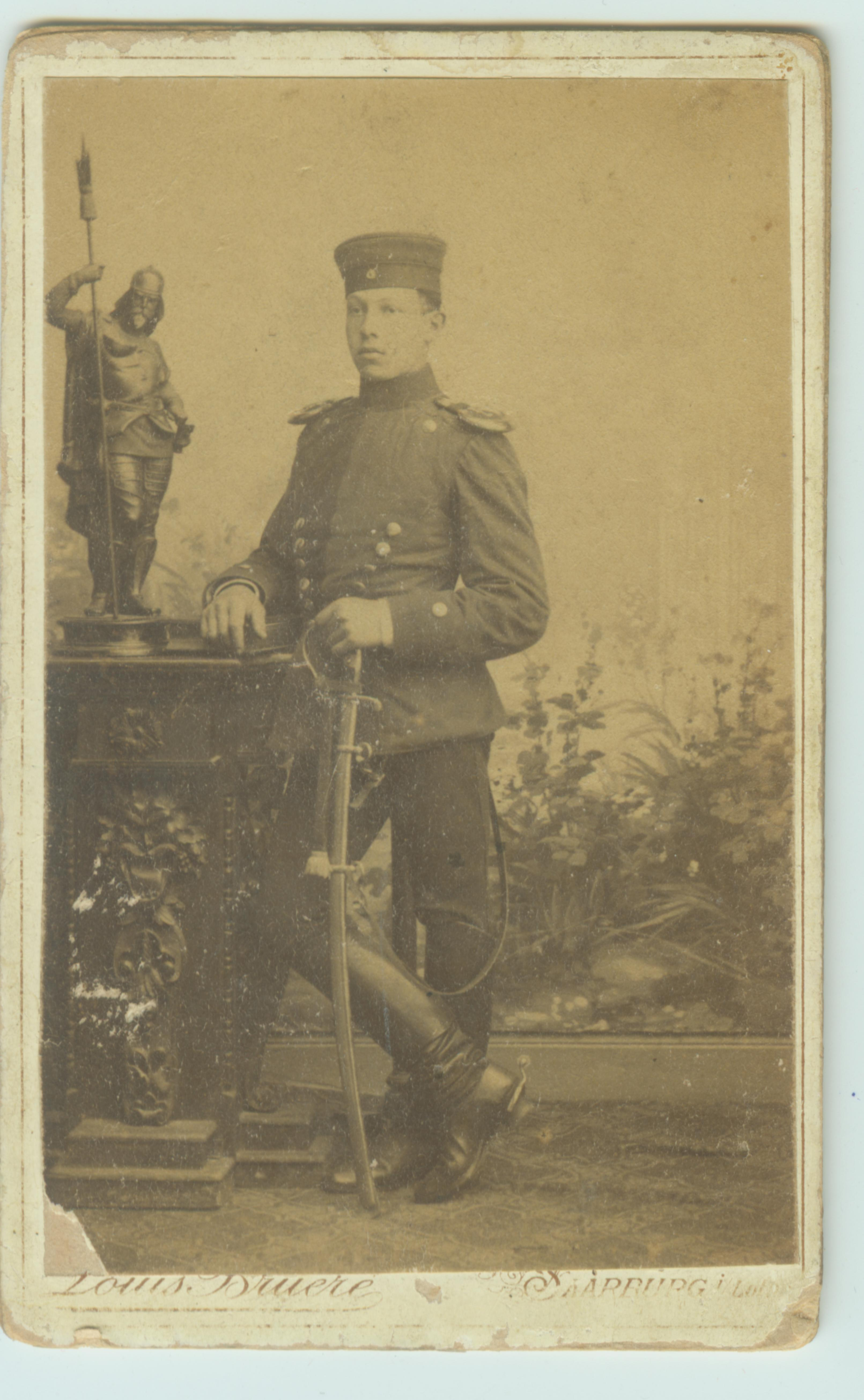
1890: Gustav Ermann, a Jewish soldier in the German Kaiser's army, born in Saarbrücken

Jews experienced a period of legal equality after 1848. Baden and Württemberg passed the legislation that gave the Jews complete equality before the law in 1861–64. The newly formed German Empire did the same in 1871. Historian Fritz Stern concludes that by 1900, what had emerged was a Jewish-German symbiosis, where German Jews had merged elements of German and Jewish culture into a unique new one. Marriages between Jews and non-Jews became somewhat common from the 19th century; for example, the wife of German Chancellor Gustav Stresemann was Jewish. However, opportunity for high appointments in the military, the diplomatic service, judiciary or senior bureaucracy was very small. Some historians believe that with emancipation the Jewish people lost their roots in their culture and began only using German culture. However, other historians including Marion A. Kaplan, argue that it was the opposite and Jewish women were the initiators of balancing both Jewish and German culture during Imperial Germany. Jewish women played a key role in keeping the Jewish communities in tune with the changing society that was evoked by the Jews being emancipated. Jewish women were the catalyst of modernization within the Jewish community. The years 1870–1918 marked the shift in the women's role in society. Their job in the past had been housekeeping and raising children. Now, however, they began to contribute to the home financially. Jewish mothers were the only tool families had to linking Judaism with German culture. They felt it was their job to raise children that would fit in with bourgeois Germany. Women had to balance enforcing German traditions while also preserving Jewish traditions. Women were in charge of keeping kosher and the Sabbath; as well as, teaching their children German speech and dressing them in German clothing. Jewish women attempted to create an exterior presence of German while maintaining the Jewish lifestyle inside their homes.

During the history of the German Empire, there were various divisions within the German Jewish community over its future; in religious terms, Orthodox Jews sought to keep to Jewish religious tradition, while liberal Jews sought to "modernise" their communities by shifting from liturgical traditions to organ music and German-language prayers.

Many immigrants travelled through Germany on the way to other countries. By the outbreak of World War I, five million emigrants from Russia had passed through German territory. Around two million Jews passed through the eastern border of Germany between 1880 and 1914 with around 78,000 remaining in Germany.

The Jewish population grew from 512,000 in 1871 to 615,000 in 1910, including 79,000 recent immigrants from Russia, just under one percent of the total. About 15,000 Jews converted to Christianity between 1871 and 1909. The typical attitude of German liberals towards Jews was that they were in Germany to stay and were capable of being assimilated; anthropologist and politician Rudolf Virchow summarised this position, saying "The Jews are simply here. You cannot strike them dead." This position, however, did not tolerate cultural differences between Jews and non-Jews, advocating instead eliminating this difference.

=== World War I ===
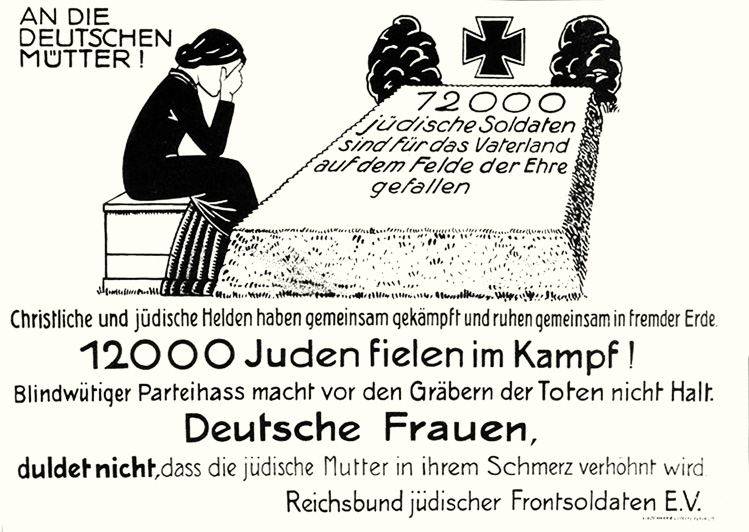
A leaflet published in 1920 by the Reichsbund jüdischer Frontsoldaten (German Jewish veterans organization) in response to accusations of lack of patriotism: Inscription on the tomb: "12,000 Jewish soldiers died on the field of honor for the fatherland".

A higher percentage of German Jews fought in World War I than of any other ethnic, religious or political minority in Germany; around 12,000 died in the fighting.

Many German Jews supported the war out of patriotism; like many Germans, they viewed Germany's actions as defensive in nature and even left-liberal Jews believed Germany was responding to the actions of other countries, particularly Russia. For many Jews it was never a question as to whether or not they would stand behind Germany, it was simply a given that they would. The fact that the enemy was Russia also gave an additional reason for German Jews to support the war; Tsarist Russia was regarded as the oppressor in the eyes of German Jews for its pogroms and for many German Jews, the war against Russia would become a sort of holy war. While there was partially a desire for vengeance, for many Jews ensuring Russia's Jewish population was saved from a life of servitude was equally important – one German-Jewish publication stated "We are fighting to protect our holy fatherland, to rescue European culture and to liberate our brothers in the east." War fervour was as common amongst Jewish communities as it was amongst ethnic Germans ones. The main Jewish organisation in Germany, the Central Association of German Citizens of the Jewish Faith, declared unconditional support for the war and when 5 August was declared by the Kaiser to be a day of patriotic prayer, synagogues across Germany surged with visitors and filled with patriotic prayers and nationalistic speeches.

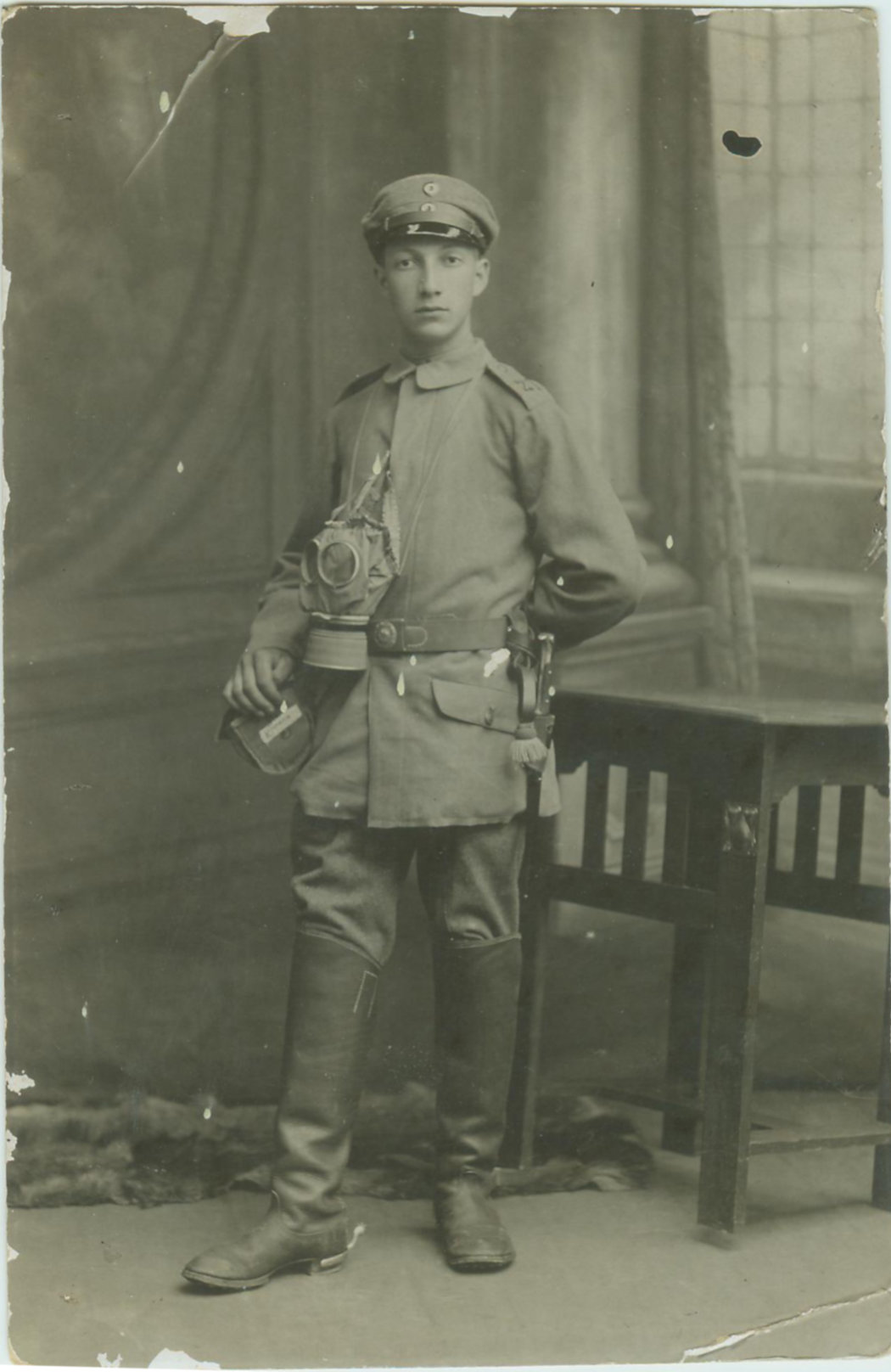
Willi Ermann of Saarbrücken, a German Jewish soldier in World War I: Ermann was murdered at Auschwitz in the Holocaust.

While going to war brought the unsavoury prospect of fighting fellow Jews in Russia, France and Britain, for the majority of Jews this severing of ties with Jewish communities in the Entente was accepted part of their spiritual mobilisation for war. After all, the conflict also pitted German Catholics and Protestants against their fellow believers in the east and west. Indeed, for some Jews the fact that Jews were going to war with one another was proof of the normality of German-Jewish life; they could no longer be considered a minority with transnational loyalties but loyal German citizens. German Jews often broke ties with Jews of other countries; the Alliance Israélite Universelle, a French organisation that was dedicated to protecting Jewish rights, saw a German Jewish member quit once the war started, declaring that he could not, as a German, belong to a society that was under French leadership. German Jews supported German colonial ambitions in Africa and Eastern Europe, out of the desire to increase German power and to rescue Eastern European Jews from Tsarist rule. The eastern advance became important for German Jews because it combined German military superiority with rescuing Eastern Jews from Russian brutality; Russian antisemitism and pogroms had only worsened as the war dragged on. However, German Jews did not always feel a personal kinship with Russian Jews. Many were repelled by Eastern Jews, who dressed and behaved differently, as well as being much more religiously devout. Victor Klemperer, a German Jew working for military censors, stated "No, I did not belong to these people, even if one proved my blood relation to them a hundred times over...I belonged to Europe, to Germany, and I thanked my creator that I was German." This was a common attitude amongst ethnic Germans however; during the invasion of Russia the territories the Germans overran seemed backwards and primitive, thus for many Germans their experiences in Russia simply reinforced their national self-concept.

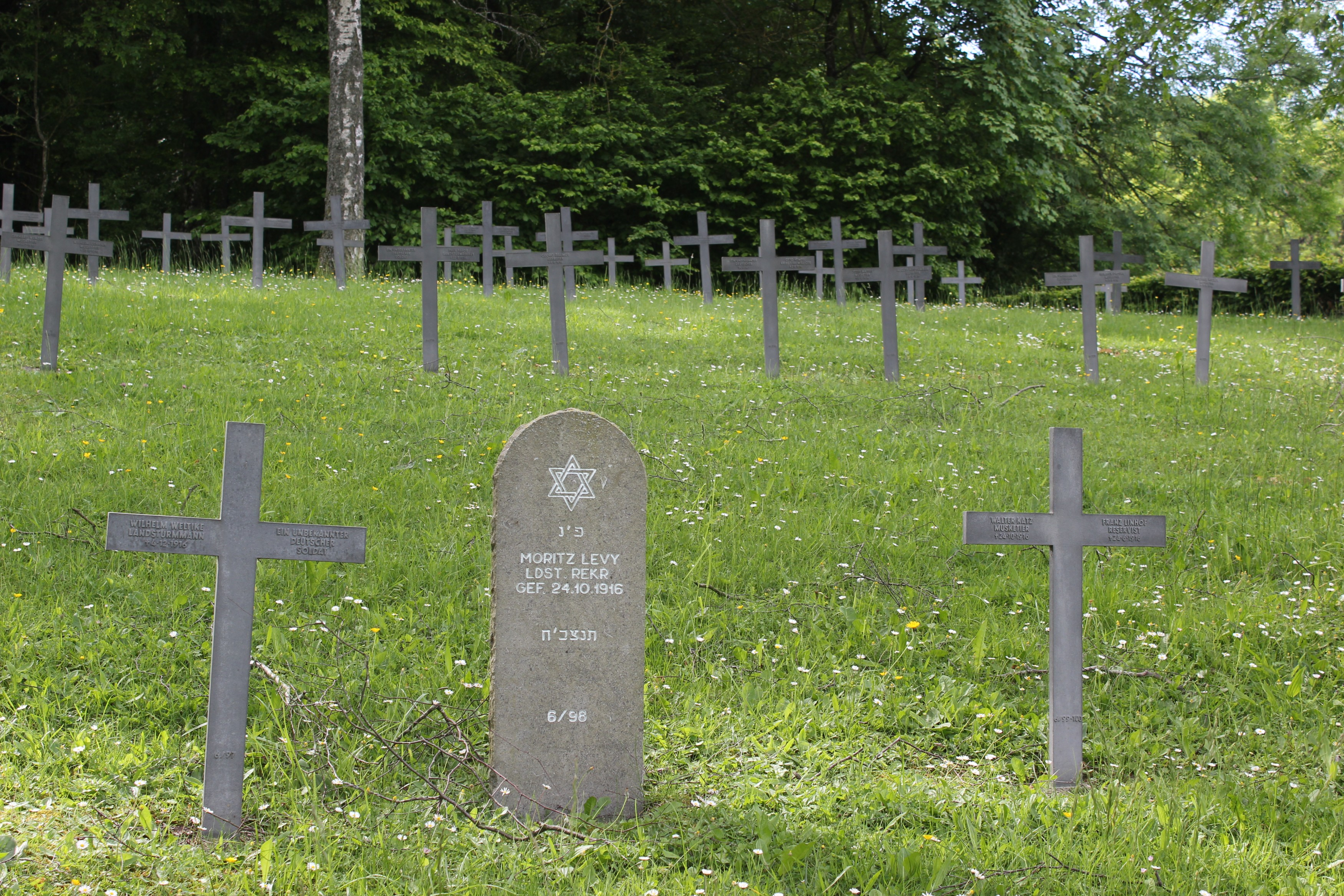
The headstones of the fallen Jewish soldiers who fought for Germany in World War I were removed during World War II, and were later replaced. This cemetery is in northern France.

Prominent Jewish industrialists and bankers, such as Walther Rathenau and Max Warburg played major roles in supervising the German war economy.

In October 1916, the German Military High Command administered the Judenzählung (census of Jews). Designed to confirm accusations of the lack of patriotism among German Jews, the census disproved the charges, but its results were not made public. Denounced as a "statistical monstrosity", the census was a catalyst to intensified antisemitism and social myths such as the "stab-in-the-back myth" (Dolchstoßlegende). For many Jews, the fact the census was carried out at all caused a sense of betrayal, as German Jews had taken part in the violence, food shortages, nationalist sentiment and misery of attrition alongside their fellow Germans, however most German-Jewish soldiers carried on dutifully to the bitter end.

When strikes broke out in Germany towards the end of the war, some Jews supported them. However, the majority of Jews had little sympathy for the strikers and one Jewish newspaper accused the strikers of "stabbing the frontline army in the back." Like many Germans, German Jews would lament the Treaty of Versailles.

== Weimar years, 1919–33 ==
Under the Weimar Republic, 1919–1933, German Jews played a major role in politics and diplomacy for the first time in their history, and they strengthened their position in financial, economic, and cultural affairs. Hugo Preuß was Interior Minister under the first post-imperial regime and wrote the first draft of the liberal Weimar Constitution. Walther Rathenau, chairman of the General Electricity Company (AEG), served as foreign minister in 1922, when he negotiated the important Treaty of Rapallo. He was assassinated two months later.

In 1914, Jews were well-represented among the wealthy, including 23.7 percent of the 800 richest individuals in Prussia, and eight percent of the university students. Jewish businesses, however, no longer had the economic prominence they had in previous decades. The Jewish middle class suffered increasing economic deprivation, and by 1930 a quarter of the German Jewish community had to be supported through community welfare programs. Germany's Jewish community was also highly urbanized, with 80 percent living in cities.

=== Antisemitism ===
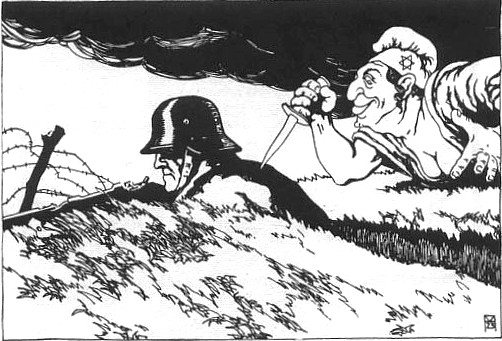
Austrian postcard published in 1919, depicting the legend of Jewish betrayal during WWI

There was sporadic antisemitism based on the false allegation that wartime Germany had been betrayed by an enemy within. There was some violence against German Jews in the early years of the Weimar Republic, and it was led by the paramilitary Freikorps. The Protocols of the Elders of Zion (1920), a forgery which claimed that Jews were taking over the world, was widely circulated. The second half of the 1920s were prosperous, and antisemitism was much less noticeable. When the Great Depression hit in 1929, it surged again as Adolf Hitler and his Nazi party promoted a virulent strain.

Author Jay Howard Geller says that four possible responses were available to the German Jewish community. The majority of German Jews were only nominally religious and they saw their Jewish identity as only one of several identities; they opted for bourgeois liberalism and assimilation into all phases of German culture. A second group (especially recent migrants from eastern Europe) embraced Judaism and Zionism. A third group of left-wing elements endorsed the universalism of Marxism, which downplayed ethnicity and antisemitism. A fourth group contained some who embraced hardcore German nationalism and minimized or hid their Jewish heritage. When the Nazis came to power in 1933, a fifth option was seized upon by hundreds of thousands: escape into exile, typically at the cost of leaving all wealth behind.

The German legal system generally treated Jews fairly throughout the period. The Centralverein, the major organization of German Jewry, used the court system to vigorously defend Jewry against antisemitic attacks across Germany; it proved generally successful.

=== Intellectuals ===
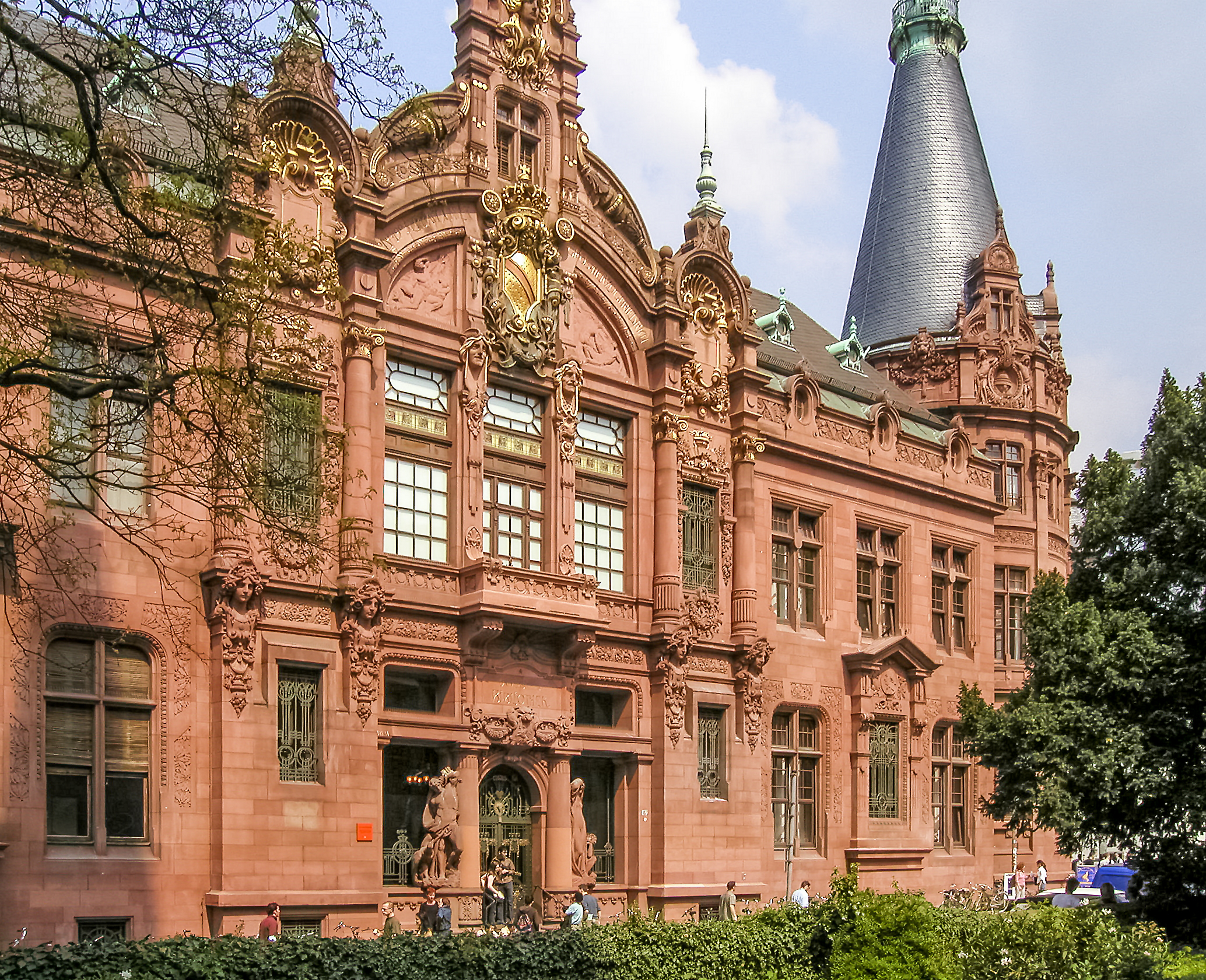
Heidelberg University was considered to be one of the most eminent institutions of Jewish-German learning.

Jewish intellectuals and creative professionals were among the leading figures in many areas of Weimar culture. German university faculties became universally open to Jewish scholars in 1918. Leading Jewish intellectuals on university faculties included physicist Albert Einstein; sociologists Karl Mannheim, Erich Fromm, Theodor Adorno, Max Horkheimer, and Herbert Marcuse; philosophers Ernst Cassirer and Edmund Husserl; communist political theorist Arthur Rosenberg; sexologist and pioneering LGBT advocate Magnus Hirschfeld, and many others. Seventeen German citizens were awarded Nobel prizes during the Weimar Republic (1919–1933), five of whom were Jewish scientists. The German-Jewish literary magazine, Der Morgen, was established in 1925. It published essays and stories by prominent Jewish writers such as Franz Kafka and Leo Hirsch until its liquidation by the Nazi government in 1938.

== Under the Nazis (1933–1945) ==
In Germany, according to historian Hans Mommsen, there were three types of antisemitism. In a 1997 interview, Mommsen was quoted as saying:

One should differentiate between the cultural antisemitism symptomatic of the German conservatives—found especially in the German officer corps and the high civil administration—and mainly directed against the Eastern Jews on the one hand, and völkisch antisemitism on the other. The conservative variety functions, as Shulamit Volkov has pointed out, as something of a "cultural code." This variety of German antisemitism later on played a significant role insofar as it prevented the functional elite from distancing itself from the repercussions of racial antisemitism. Thus, there was almost no relevant protest against the Jewish persecution on the part of the generals or the leading groups within the Reich government. This is especially true with respect to Hitler's proclamation of the "racial annihilation war" against the Soviet Union. Besides conservative antisemitism, there existed in Germany a rather silent anti-Judaism within the Catholic Church, which had a certain impact on immunizing the Catholic population against the escalating persecution. The famous protest of the Catholic Church against the euthanasia program was, therefore, not accompanied by any protest against the Holocaust.

The third and most vitriolic variety of antisemitism in Germany (and elsewhere) is the so-called völkisch antisemitism or racism, and this is the foremost advocate of using violence.

In 1933, persecution of the Jews became an active Nazi policy, but at first laws were not as rigorously obeyed or as devastating as in later years. Such clauses, known as Aryan paragraphs, had been postulated previously by antisemitism and enacted in many private organizations.

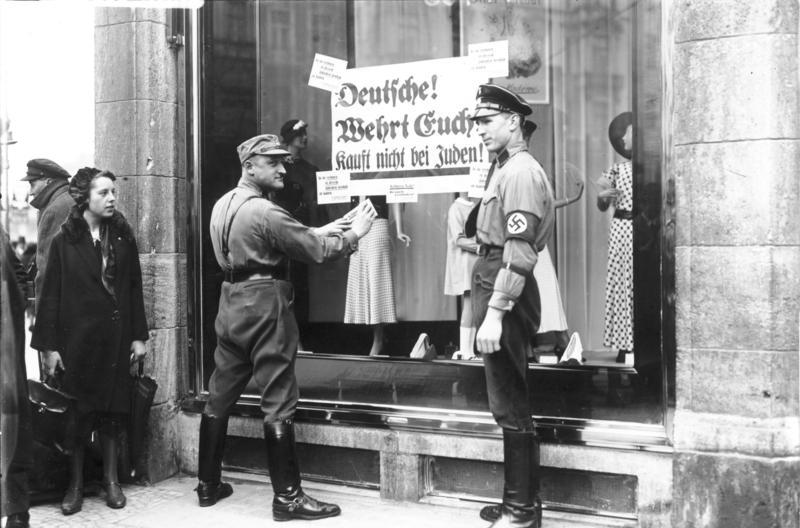
The boycott of 1 April 1933

The continuing and exacerbating abuse of Jews in Germany triggered calls throughout March 1933 by Jewish leaders around the world for a boycott of German products. The Nazis responded with further bans and boycotts against Jewish doctors, shops, lawyers and stores. Only six days later, the Law for the Restoration of the Professional Civil Service was passed, banning Jews from being employed in government. This law meant that Jews were now indirectly and directly dissuaded or banned from privileged and upper-level positions reserved for "Aryan" Germans. From then on, Jews were forced to work at more menial positions, beneath non-Jews, pushing them to more labored positions.

The Civil Service Law reached immediately into the education system because university professors, for example, were civil servants. While the majority of the German intellectual classes were not thoroughgoing National Socialists, academia had been suffused with a "cultured antisemitism" since imperial times, even more so during Weimar. With the majority of non-Jewish professors holding such feelings about Jews, coupled with how the Nazis' outwardly appeared in the period during and after the seizure of power, there was little motivation to oppose the anti-Jewish measures being enacted—few did, and many were actively in favor. According to a German professor of the history of mathematics, "There is no doubt that most of the German mathematicians who were members of the professional organization collaborated with the Nazis, and did nothing to save or help their Jewish colleagues." "German physicians were highly Nazified, compared to other professionals, in terms of party membership," observed Raul Hilberg and some even carried out experiments on human beings at places like Auschwitz.

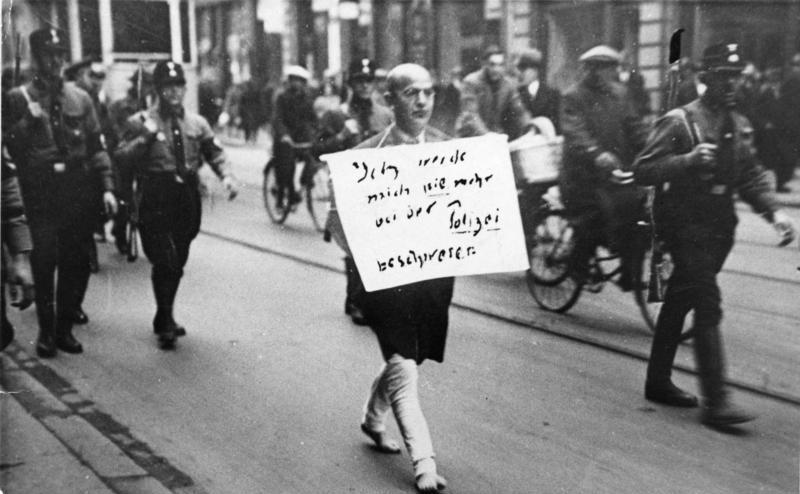
Taken in March 1933, immediately after the Nazis seized power, this photo shows Nazi SA militants forcing a Jewish lawyer to walk barefoot through the streets of Munich wearing a sign that says "I will never again complain to the police".

On 2 August 1934, President Paul von Hindenburg died. No new president was appointed. Instead, the functions and ceremony of the presidency were merged with that of the chancellor, making Hitler, as Führer, both head of state and head of government. This power consolidation, and a lame-duck Reichstag with no true opposition parties, gave Adolf Hitler totalitarian control of law-making. The army also swore an oath of loyalty personally to Hitler, giving him absolute power over the military; this position allowed him to enforce his antisemitic beliefs further by creating more state pressure on the Jews than ever before.

In 1935 and 1936, the pace of persecution of the Jews increased. In May 1935, Jews were forbidden to join the Wehrmacht (Armed Forces), and that year, anti-Jewish propaganda appeared in Nazi German shops and restaurants. The Nuremberg Racial Purity Laws were passed around the time of the Nazi rallies at Nuremberg; on 15 September 1935, the Law for the Protection of German Blood and Honor was passed, preventing sexual relations and marriages between Aryans and Jews. At the same time the Reich Citizenship Law was passed and was reinforced in November by a decree, stating that all Jews, even quarter- and half-Jews, were no longer citizens (Reichsbürger) of their own country. Their official status became Reichsangehöriger, "subject of the state". This meant that they had no basic civil rights, such as the right to vote, though elections in Germany by this time were total shams, where voters could only vote for Nazi candidates and "approve" decrees set by the regime. This removal of basic citizens' rights anticipated even harsher laws and proscriptions against Jews. The drafting of the Nuremberg Laws is often attributed to Hans Globke.

In 1936, Jews were banned from all professional jobs, effectively preventing them from exerting any influence in education, politics, higher education, and business. Because of this, there was nothing to stop the anti-Jewish actions that spread across the Nazi-German economy.

After the Night of the Long Knives, the Schutzstaffel (SS) became the dominant policing power in Germany. Reichsführer-SS Heinrich Himmler was a virulent antisemite and zealous executor of regime antisemitic policy who gained a near-total monopoly on law enforcement and state security functions in Nazi Germany by 1936. Since the SS had started as Hitler's personal bodyguard, its members were far more loyal and disciplined than those of the Sturmabteilung (SA) had been. Because of this, they were also supported, though distrusted, by the Wehrmacht, which was now more willing to submit to Hitler's decrees than when the SA was dominant. All of this allowed Hitler more direct control over government and political attitude towards Jews in Nazi Germany. In 1937 and 1938, new laws were implemented, and the segregation of Jews from the true "Aryan" German population was started. In particular, Jews were penalized financially for their perceived racial status.

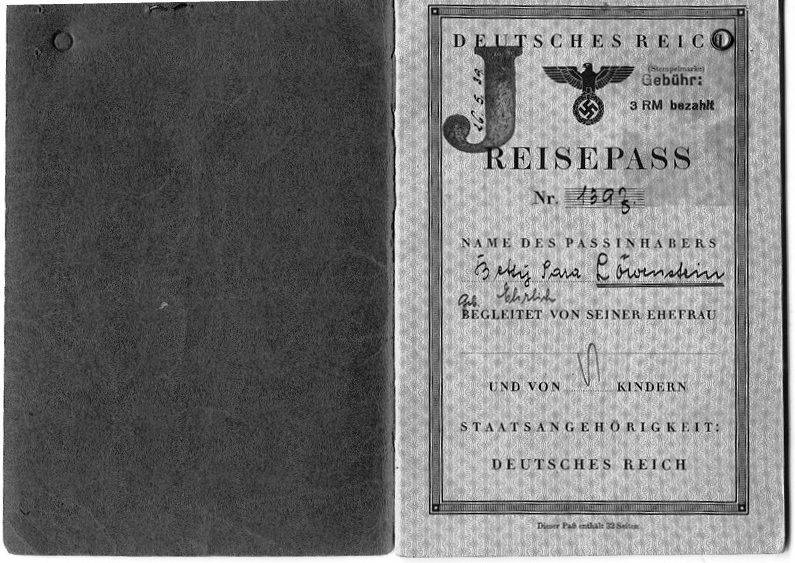
German Jewish passports could be used to leave, but not to return.

On 4 June 1937, two young German Jews, Helmut Hirsch and Isaac Utting, were both executed for being involved in a plot to bomb the Nazi party headquarters in Nuremberg.

As of 1 March 1938, government contracts could no longer be awarded to Jewish businesses. On 30 September, "Aryan" doctors could only treat "Aryan" patients. Provision of medical care to Jews was already hampered by the fact that Jews were banned from being doctors or having any professional jobs.

Beginning 17 August 1938, Jews with first names of non-Jewish origin had to add Israel (males) or Sarah (females) to their names, and a large J was to be imprinted on their passports beginning 5 October. On 15 November Jewish children were banned from going to normal schools. By April 1939, nearly all Jewish companies had either collapsed under financial pressure and declining profits, or had been forced to sell out to the Nazi German government. This further reduced Jews' rights as human beings. They were in many ways officially separated from the German population.

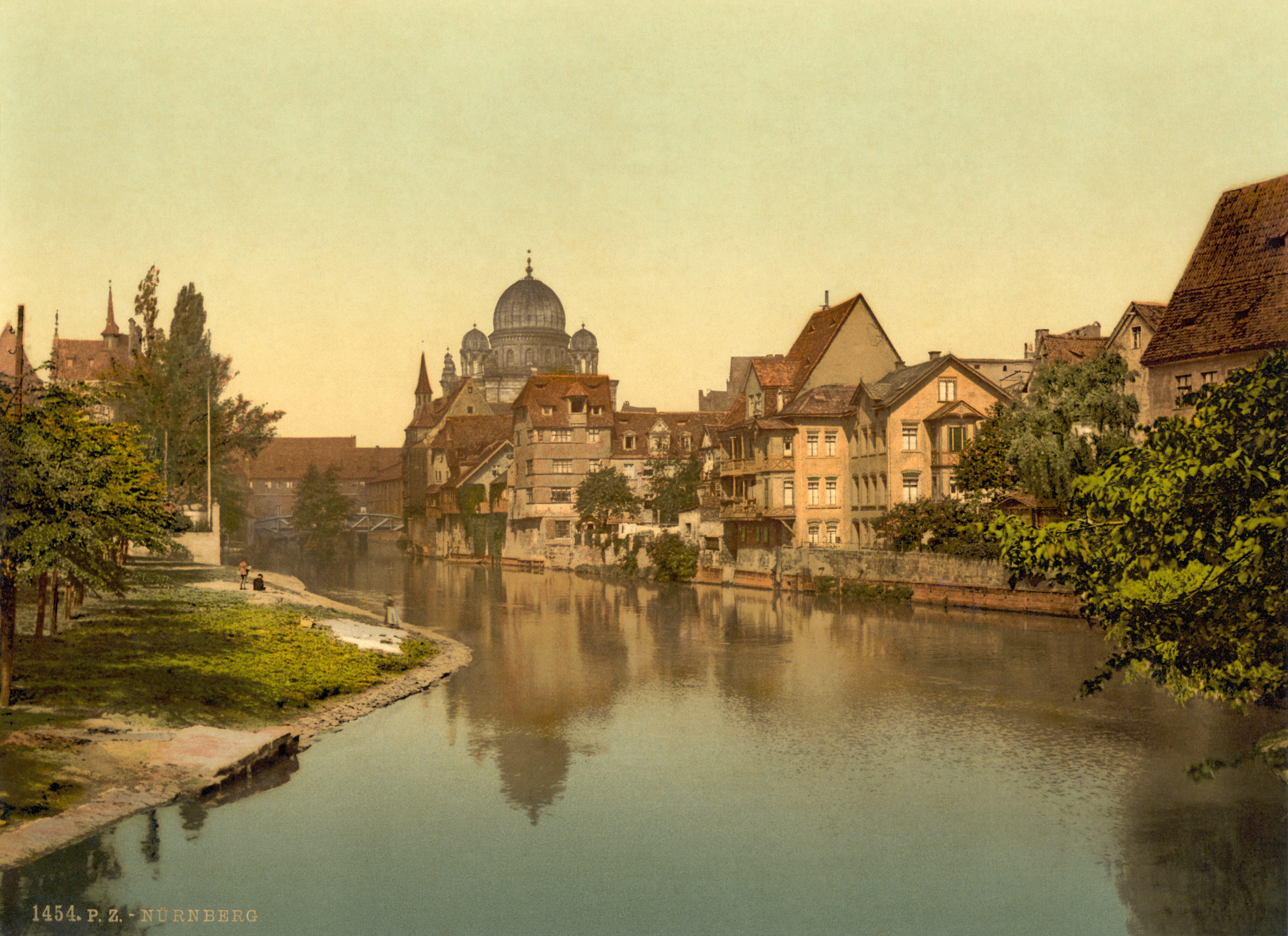
Synagogue at Nuremberg, c. 1890–1900. The structure was destroyed in 1938.

The increasingly totalitarian, militaristic regime which was being imposed on Germany by Hitler allowed him to control the actions of the SS and the military. On 7 November 1938, a young Polish Jew, Herschel Grynszpan, attacked and shot two German officials in the Nazi German embassy in Paris. (Grynszpan was angry about the treatment of his parents by the Nazis.) On 9 November the German Attache, Ernst vom Rath, who had been shot by Grynszpan, died. Joseph Goebbels issued instructions that demonstrations against Jews were to be organized and undertaken in retaliation throughout Germany. On 10 November 1938, Reinhard Heydrich ordered the state police and the Sturmabteilung (SA) to destroy Jewish property and arrest as many Jews as possible in what became known as the Night of Broken Glass (Kristallnacht). The storefronts of Jewish shops and offices were smashed and vandalized, and many synagogues were destroyed by fire. Approximately 91 Jews were killed, and another 30,000 arrested, mostly able bodied males, all of whom were sent to the newly formed concentration camps. In the following 3 months some 2,000–2,500 of them died in the concentration camps, the rest were released under the condition that they leave Germany. Many Germans were disgusted by this action when the full extent of the damage was discovered, so Hitler ordered that it be blamed on the Jews. The Nazis announced the "Jewish Capital Levy" (German: Judenvermögensabgabe), a one billion Reichsmark tax (equivalent to US$4.3 billion in 2025). Any Jews owning assets exceeding 5,000 ℛ︁ℳ︁ had to surrender 20% of those assets. The Jews also had to repair all damages at their own cost.

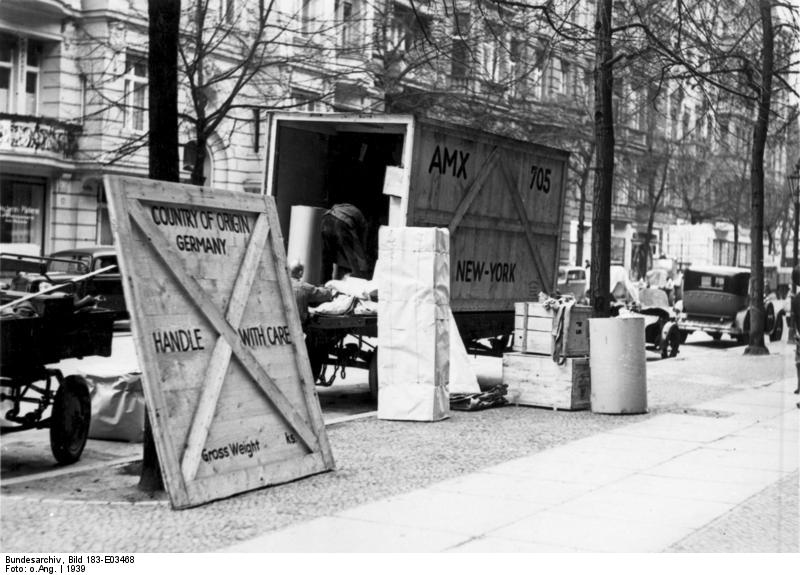
Jews emigrating from Berlin to the United States, 1939

Increasing antisemitism prompted a wave of Jewish mass emigration from Germany throughout the 1930s. Among the first wave were intellectuals, politically active individuals, and Zionists. However, as Nazi legislation worsened the Jews' situation, more Jews wished to leave Germany, with a panicked rush in the months after Kristallnacht in 1938.

Mandatory Palestine was a popular destination for German Jewish emigration. Soon after the Nazis' rise to power in 1933, they negotiated the Haavara Agreement with Zionist authorities in Palestine, which was signed on 25 August 1933. Under its terms, 60,000 German Jews were to be allowed to emigrate to Palestine. During the Fifth Aliyah, between 1929 and 1939, a total of 250,000 Jewish immigrants arrived in Palestine—more than 55,000 of them from Germany, Austria, or Bohemia. Many of them were doctors, lawyers, engineers, architects, and other professionals, who contributed greatly to the development of the Yishuv.

The United States was another destination for German Jews seeking to leave the country, though the number allowed to immigrate was restricted due to the Immigration Act of 1924. Between 1933 and 1939, more than 300,000 Germans, of whom about 90% were Jews, applied for immigration visas to the United States. By 1940, only 90,000 German Jews had been granted visas and allowed to settle in the United States. Some 100,000 German Jews also moved to Western European countries, especially France, Belgium, and the Netherlands. However, these countries would later be occupied by Germany, and most of them would still fall victim to the Holocaust. Another 48,000 emigrated to the United Kingdom and other European countries.

=== The Holocaust in Germany ===
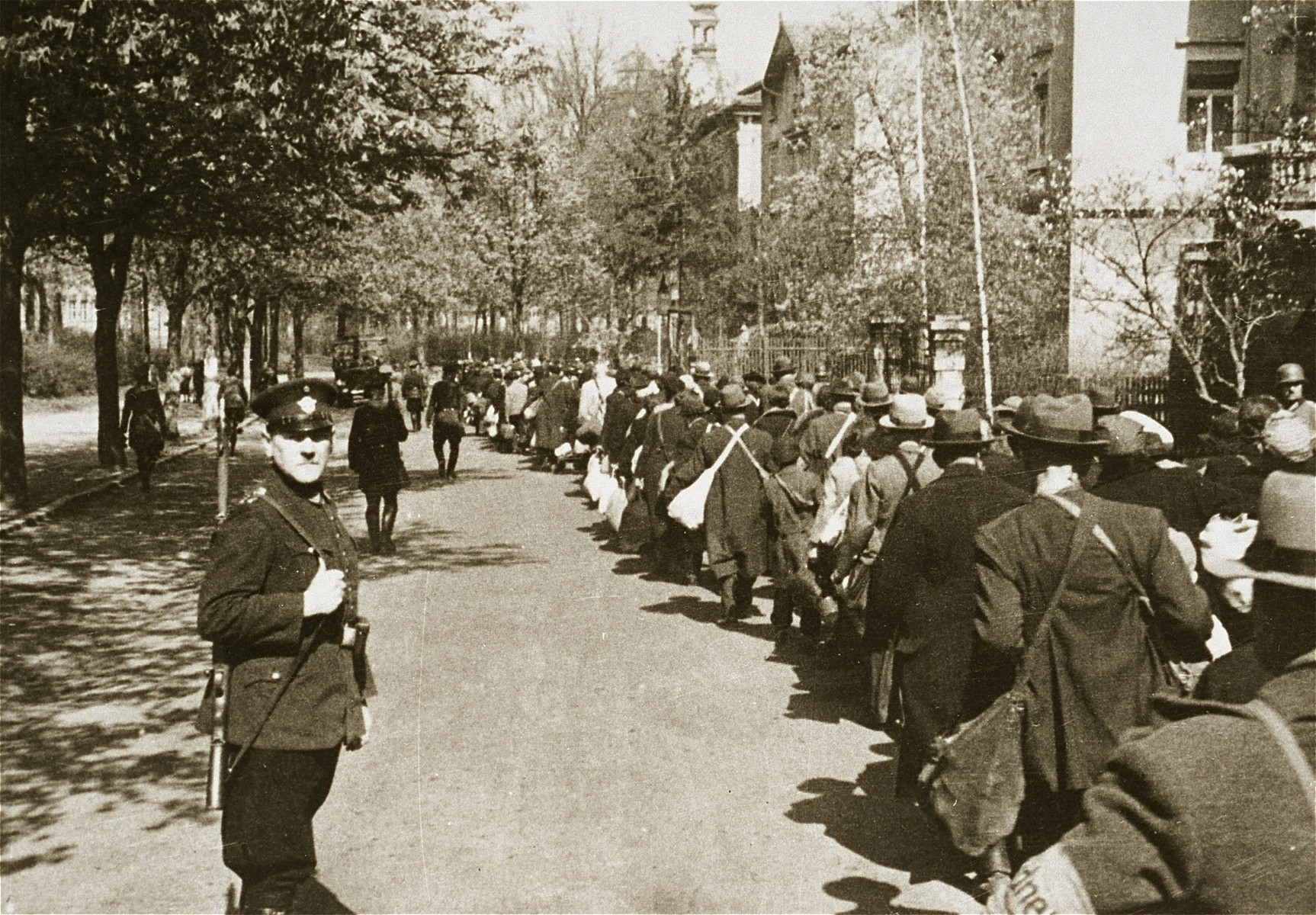
Jews are deported from Würzburg to the Lublin District of occupied Poland, 25 April 1942

Overall, of the 522,000 Jews living in Germany in January 1933, approximately 304,000 emigrated during the first six years of Nazi rule and about 214,000 were left on the eve of World War II. Of these, 160,000–180,000 were killed as a part of the Holocaust. Those that remained in Germany went into hiding and did everything they could to survive. Commonly referred to as "dashers and divers," the Jews lived a submerged life and experienced the struggle to find food, a relatively secure hiding space or shelter, and false identity papers while constantly evading Nazi police and strategically avoiding checkpoints. Non-Jews offered support by allowing the Jews to hide in their homes but when this proved to be too dangerous for both parties, the Jews were forced to seek shelter in more exposed locations including the street. Some Jews were able to attain false papers, despite the risks and sacrifice of resources doing so required. A reliable false ID would cost between 2,000RM and 6,000RM depending on where it came from. Some Jews in Berlin looked to the Black Market to get false papers as this was a most sought-after product following food, tobacco, and clothing. Certain forms of ID were soon deemed unacceptable, leaving the Jews with depleted resources and vulnerable to being arrested. Avoiding arrest was particularly challenging in 1943 as the Nazi police increased their personnel and inspection checkpoints, leading to 65 percent of all submerged Jews being detained and likely deported. On 19 May 1943, only about 20,000 Jews remained and Germany was declared judenrein (clean of Jews; also judenfrei: free of Jews).

== Persistence of antisemitism ==
During the medieval period, antisemitism flourished in Germany. Especially during the Black Death, which lasted from 1348 to 1350, hatred and violence against Jews increased. Approximately 72% of towns with Jewish populations were subjected to violent attacks.

Regions that were subjected to the Black Death pogroms were 6 times more likely to be subjected to antisemitic violence during the 1920s, racist and fascist political parties like the DNVP, NSDAP and the DVFP gained a voting share that 1.5 times higher than the voting share which other political parties gained during the 1928 election, their inhabitants wrote more letters to antisemitic newspapers like "Der Stürmer", and they deported more Jews during Nazi rule. This situation was due to the cultural transmission of antisemitism.

According to a study which was conducted by Nico Voigtländer and Hans-Joachim Voth, Germans who grew up during Nazi rule are significantly more antisemitic than Germans who were born either before or after it. In addition, Voigtländer and Voth found that Nazi antisemitic indoctrination was more effective in areas where antisemitism was pre-existing and widespread.

A simple model of cultural transmission in relation to the persistence of antisemitic attitudes was developed by Bisin and Verdier, who state that children acquire their preference schemes by imitating their parents, who attempt to socialize their children in accordance with their own preferences, without determining if these traits are either useful or useless.

Economic factors had the potential to undermine the persistence of these traits throughout the centuries. Hatred against outsiders was more costly to trading organizations which were active in trade-open cities, like the members of the Hanseatic League. Cities which grew at a faster rate experienced a decline in the persistence of antisemitic attitudes, this situation may have been due to the fact that trade-openness was associated with more economic success and therefore, higher migration rates occurred in these regions.

== From 1945 to the reunification ==
When the Red Army took over Berlin in late April 1945, only 8,000 Jews remained in the city, all of them were either in hiding or they were married to non-Jews. Most German Jews who survived the war in exile decided to remain abroad; however, a small number returned to Germany. Additionally, approximately 15,000 German Jews survived the concentration camps or survived by going into hiding. These German Jews were joined by approximately 200,000 displaced persons (DPs), Eastern European Jewish Holocaust survivors. They came to Allied-occupied western Germany after finding no homes left for them in eastern Europe or after having been liberated on German soil. The overwhelming majority of the DPs wished to emigrate to Mandatory Palestine and lived in Allied- and UNRRA-administered displaced persons camps, remaining isolated from German society. When Israel became independent in 1948, most European-Jewish DPs left for the new state; however, 10,000 to 15,000 Jews decided to resettle in Germany. Despite hesitations and a long history of antagonism between German Jews (Yekkes) and East European Jews (Ostjuden), the two disparate groups united to form the basis of a new Jewish community. In 1950 they founded their unitary representative organization, the Central Council of Jews in Germany. The Central Council acted as a successor organization to the earlier Deutsch-Israelitischer Gemeindebund, which had been disbanded by the Nazis.

=== Jews of West Germany ===
From the 1950s to the 1970s, the Jewish community of West Germany was characterized by its social conservatism and its generally private nature. Although there were Jewish elementary schools in West Berlin, Frankfurt, and Munich, the community had a very high average age. Few young adults chose to remain in Germany, and many of those who did married non-Jews. Many critics of the community and its leadership accused it of ossification. In the 1980s, a college for Jewish studies was established in Heidelberg; however, a disproportionate number of its students were not Jewish. By 1990, the community numbered between 30,000 and 40,000. Although the Jewish community of Germany did not have the same impact as the pre-1933 community, some Jews were prominent in German public life, including Hamburg mayor Herbert Weichmann; Schleswig-Holstein Minister of Justice (and Deputy Chief Justice of the Federal Constitutional Court) Rudolf Katz; Hesse Attorney General Fritz Bauer; former Hesse Minister of Economics Heinz-Herbert Karry; West Berlin politician Jeanette Wolff; television personalities Hugo Egon Balder, Hans Rosenthal, Ilja Richter, Inge Meysel, and Michel Friedman; Jewish communal leaders Heinz Galinski, Ignatz Bubis, Paul Spiegel, and Charlotte Knobloch (see: Central Council of Jews in Germany), film score composer Hans Zimmer, and Germany's most influential literary critic, Marcel Reich-Ranicki.

=== Jews of East Germany ===
The Jewish community of communist East Germany only numbered a few hundred active members. Most of the Jews who settled in East Germany did so because their pre-1933 homes had been there or because they had been politically active leftists before the Nazi seizure of power and, after 1945, they wished to establish an anti-fascist, socialist Germany. Most of these politically active Jews were not religious nor were they active members of the official Jewish community. They included writers such as Anna Seghers, Stefan Heym, Stephan Hermlin, Jurek Becker, Stasi Colonel General Markus Wolf, singer Lin Jaldati, composer Hanns Eisler, and politician Gregor Gysi. However, from the 1950s to early 1980s, the State Security Service (the Stasi) persecuted the surviving small Jewish communities in East Germany. This persecution was in keeping with the treatment of religious groups in general, which were frequently persecuted because their belief systems were considered contrary to socialist values and their contact with the West made them a potential threat to the security of the state. Hostility was also espoused by the media. Jewish community leaders criticized the media for "provoking popular anti-semitism by the negative portrayal of Israel and Jews". According to the historian Mike Dennis, 'Already decimated by the Holocaust, East German Jewry reeled from the shock of the SED's (Socialist Unity Party of Germany) antisemitic campaigns.' Persecution methods ranged from the more brutal repression methods found in the Stalinist era of the 1940s and 50s, to the more subtle decomposition methods which were utilised extensively in the 70s and 80s. In the 1980s there was a reprieve, in general, of such persecution and the previous antisemitism was markedly changed with an attempt to "reinvigorate Jewish culture". Economic and political pragmatism drove this change: the socialist leadership was keen to promote East Germany as an anti-fascist state; improve its legitimacy domestically and internationally; and due to their increasingly precarious economic situation, to build bridges with the US especially in a bid to secure more favourable trading terms and to stabilise the economy. Many East German Jews emigrated to Israel in the 1970s.

== In reunited Germany (post-1990) ==
Historical German Jewish population
Year	Pop.	±%
1871	512,158	—
1880	562,612	+9.9%
1890	567,884	+0.9%
1900	586,833	+3.3%
1910	615,021	+4.8%
1925	564,379	−8.2%
1933	503,000	−10.9%
1939	234,000	−53.5%
1941	164,000	−29.9%
1950	37,000	−77.4%
1990	30,000	−18.9%
1995	60,000	+100.0%
2002	100,000	+66.7%
2011	119,000	+19.0%

Year	Jewish population in Germany	Total German population	Jewish % of population
1871	512,158	40,997,000	1.25%
1880	562,612	45,095,000	1.25%
1890	567,884	49,239,000	1.15%
1900	586,833	56,046,000	1.05%
1910	615,021	64,568,000	0.95%
1925	564,379	63,110,000	0.89%
1933	503,000	66,027,000	0.76%
1939	234,000	69,314,000	0.34%
1941	164,000	70,244,000	0.23%
1950	37,000	68,374,000	0.05%
1990	30,000	79,753,227	0.04%
1995	60,000	81,817,499	0.07%
2002	100,000	82,536,680	0.12%
2011	119,000	80,233,100	0.15%

The end of the Cold War contributed to a growth of the Jewish community of Germany. An important step for the renaissance of Jewish life in Germany occurred in 1990 when Helmut Kohl convened with Heinz Galinski, to allow Jewish people from the former Soviet Union to emigrate to Germany, which led to a large Jewish emigration. Germany is home to a nominal Jewish population of more than 200,000 (although this number reflects non-Jewish spouses or children who also immigrated under the Quota Refugee Law); around 100,000 are officially registered with Jewish religious communities. The size of the Jewish community in Berlin is estimated at 120,000 people, or 60% of Germany's total Jewish population. Today, between 80 and 90 percent of the Jews in Germany are Russian speaking immigrants from the former Soviet Union. Many Israelis also move to Germany, particularly Berlin, for its relaxed atmosphere and low cost of living. Olim L'Berlin, a Facebook snowclone asking Israelis to emigrate to Berlin, gained notoriety in 2014. Some eventually return to Israel after a period of residence in Germany. There are also a handful of Jewish families from Muslim-majority countries, including Iran, Turkey, Morocco, and Afghanistan. Germany has the third-largest Jewish population in Western Europe after France (600,000) and Britain (300,000) and the fastest-growing Jewish population in Europe in recent years. The influx of immigrants, many of them seeking renewed contact with their Ashkenazi heritage, has led to a renaissance of Jewish life in Germany. In 1996, Chabad-Lubavitch of Berlin opened a center. In 2003, Chabad-Lubavitch of Berlin ordained 10 rabbis, the first rabbis to be ordained in Germany since World War II. In 2002 a Reform rabbinical seminary, Abraham Geiger College, was established in Potsdam. In 2006, the college announced that it would be ordaining three new rabbis, the first Reform rabbis to be ordained in Germany since 1942.

Partly owing to the deep similarities between Yiddish and German, Jewish studies have become a popular academic study, and many German universities have departments or institutes of Jewish studies, culture, or history. Active Jewish religious communities have sprung up across Germany, including in many cities where the previous communities were no longer extant or were moribund. Several cities in Germany have Jewish day schools, kosher facilities, and other Jewish institutions beyond synagogues. Additionally, many of the Russian Jews were alienated from their Jewish heritage and unfamiliar or uncomfortable with religion. American-style Reform Judaism (which originated in Germany), has re-emerged in Germany, led by the Union of Progressive Jews in Germany, even though the Central Council of Jews in Germany and most local Jewish communities officially adhere to Orthodoxy.

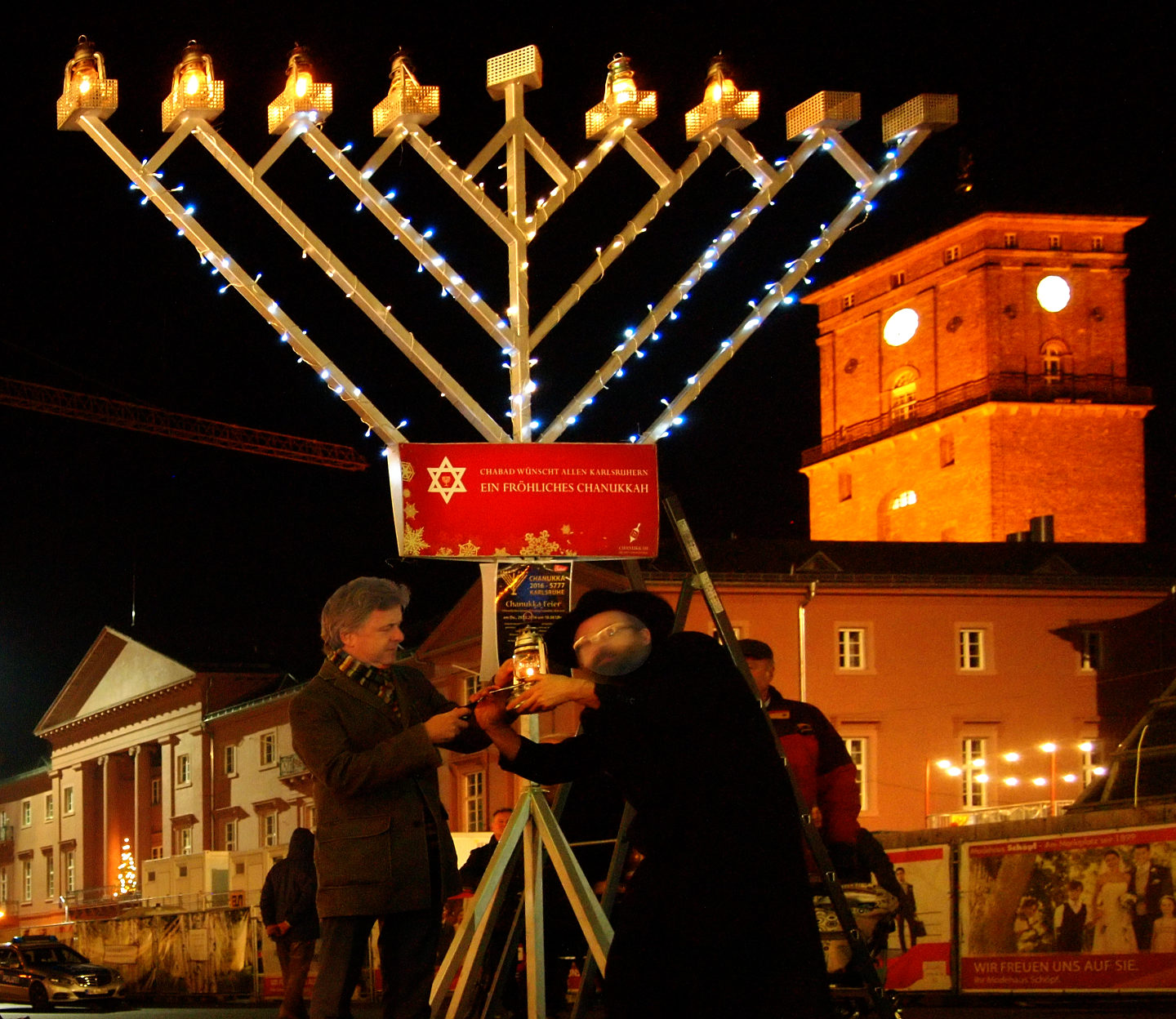
Public menorah in Karlsruhe

On 27 January 2003, then German chancellor Gerhard Schröder signed the first-ever agreement on a federal level with the Central Council, so that Judaism was granted the same elevated, semi-established legal status in Germany as the Roman Catholic Church and the Protestant Church in Germany, at least since the Basic Law for the Federal Republic of Germany of 1949.

In Germany it is a criminal act to deny the Holocaust or that six million Jews were murdered in the Holocaust (§ 130 StGB); violations can be punished with up to five years of prison. In 2007, the Interior Minister of Germany, Wolfgang Schäuble, pointed out the official policy of Germany: "We will not tolerate any form of extremism, xenophobia or antisemitism." Although the number of right-wing groups and organisations grew from 141 (2001) to 182 (2006), especially in the formerly communist East Germany, Germany's measures against right-wing groups and antisemitism are effective: according to the annual reports of the Federal Office for the Protection of the Constitution the overall number of far-right extremists in Germany has dropped in recent years from 49,700 (2001), 45,000 (2002), 41,500 (2003), 40,700 (2004), 39,000 (2005), to 38,600 in 2006. Germany provided several million euros to fund "nationwide programs aimed at fighting far-right extremism, including teams of traveling consultants, and victims' groups". Despite these facts, Israeli Ambassador Shimon Stein warned in October 2006 that Jews in Germany feel increasingly unsafe, stating that they "are not able to live a normal Jewish life" and that heavy security surrounds most synagogues or Jewish community centers. Yosef Havlin, Rabbi at the Chabad Lubavitch in Frankfurt, does not agree with the Israeli Ambassador and states in an interview with Der Spiegel in September 2007 that the German public does not support far-right groups; instead, he has personally experienced the support of Germans, and as a Jew and rabbi he "feels welcome in his (hometown) Frankfurt, he is not afraid, the city is not a no-go-area".

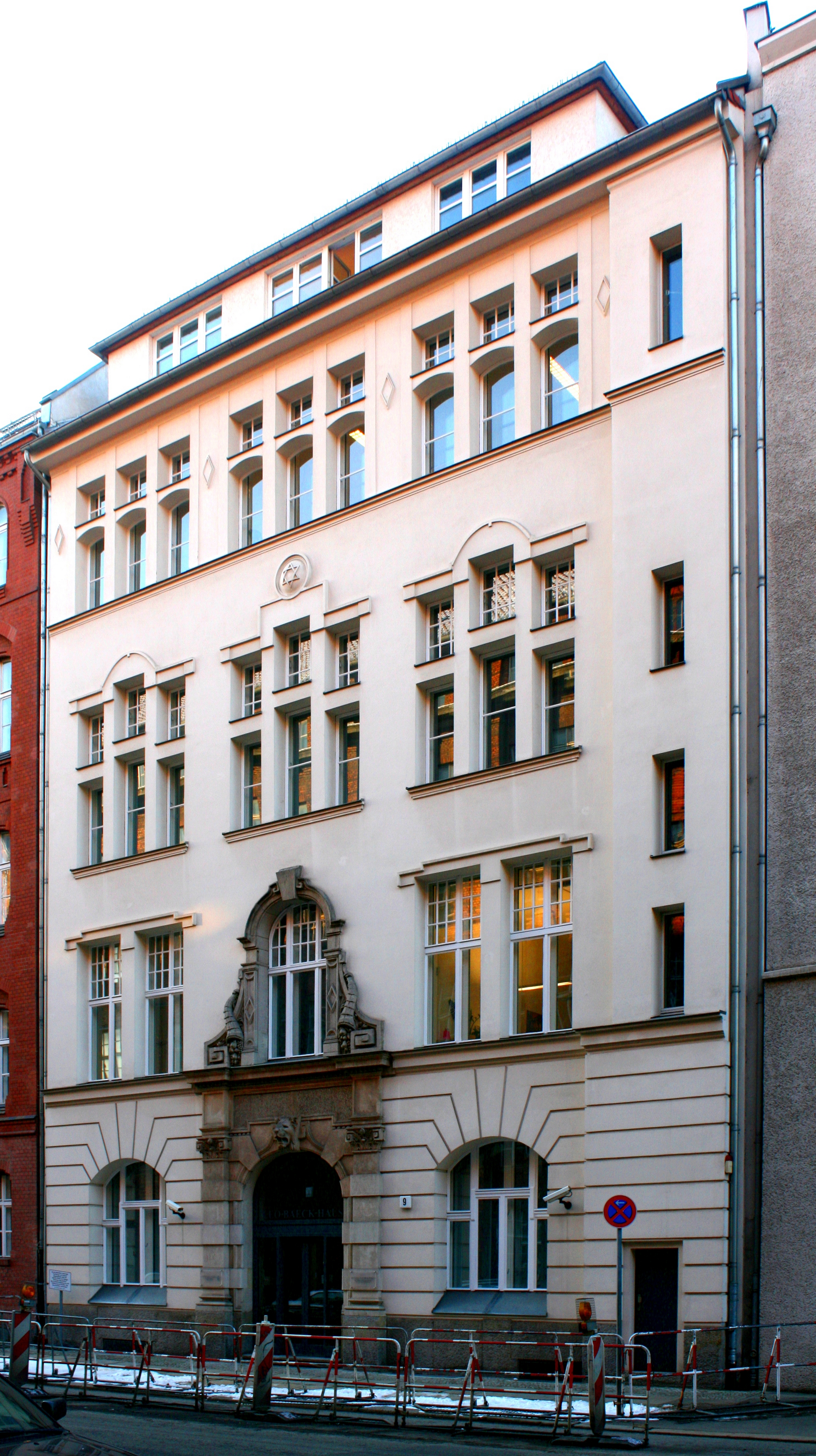
The Central Council of Jews in Germany is the nationally sanctioned organization to manage the German-Jewish community.

On November 9, 2006 (the 68th anniversary of Kristallnacht), the Ohel Jakob synagogue was inaugurated in Munich, Germany - a city that was once an ideological core of Nazi Germany. In the capital Berlin, the Jewish community was growing at the same time with the Centrum Judaicum and several synagogues—including the largest in Germany—being renovated and opened. Berlin holds an annual week of Jewish culture and the Jewish Cultural Festival, featuring concerts, exhibitions, public readings and discussions.

In spite of Germany's measures against right-wing groups and antisemites, a number of incidents have occurred in recent years. On 29 August 2012, in Berlin, Daniel Alter, a rabbi in visible Jewish garb, was physically attacked by a group of Arab youths, causing a head wound that required hospitalization. The rabbi was walking with his six-year-old daughter in downtown Berlin when the group asked if he was a Jew, and then proceeded to assault him. They also threatened to kill the rabbi's young daughter. On 9 November 2012, the 74th Kristallnacht anniversary, neo-Nazis in Greifswald vandalized the city's Holocaust memorial. Additionally, a group of Jewish children attending a Chabad school was taunted by a group of unidentified young individuals on the basis of their religion.

On 2 June 2013, a rabbi was physically assaulted by a group of six to eight "southern-looking" youths in a shopping mall in Offenbach. The rabbi took pictures of the attackers on his cellphone, but mall security and local police instructed him to delete the photos. The rabbi exited the mall, pursued by his attackers, and was driven away by an acquaintance. In Salzwedel, also in 2013, vandals painted swastikas and the words "Hitler now" on the exteriors of local houses.

Through the start of the 21st century, Germany has witnessed a sizable migration of young, educated Israeli Jews seeking academic and employment opportunities, with Berlin being their favorite destination.

Efforts to reclaim and preserve Jewish cultural heritage looted during the Nazi era continued into the 21st century. A Torah wimple and a parochet (Torah ark curtain) that were taken during the 1938 Kristallnacht pogrom were given to the Berlin Jewish community in October 2026. Following the deconsecration of the American congregation, the items were voluntarily returned to the New Synagogue Berlin–Centrum Judaicum after being brought to the United States by a Holocaust survivor and preserved by a synagogue in Phoenix, Arizona.

== See also ==
- Association of German National Jews
- Germany–Israel relations
- HaGalil Online – an online magazine for Jews in German-speaking countries
- History of the Jews in Austria
- History of the Jews in Cologne
- History of the Jews in Hamburg
- History of the Jews in Hannover
- History of the Jews in Munich
- History of the Jews in Poland
- Jewish Agency for Israel
- List of German Jews
- More German than the Germans
- Orientalism
- Peter Stevens (RAF officer)
