= Cultural psychology =

How cultures reflect and shape their psychology

Cultural psychology is the study of how cultures reflect and shape their members' psychological processes.

It is based on the premise that mind and culture are inseparable and mutually constitutive. The concept rests on two key propositions: first, that individuals are shaped by their culture, and second, that culture is shaped by the individuals within it.

Cultural psychology aims to define culture, its nature, and its function concerning psychological phenomena. Gerd Baumann argues: "Culture is not a real thing, but an abstract analytical notion. In itself, it does not cause behavior but abstracts from it. It is thus neither normative nor predictive but a heuristic means towards explaining how people understand and act upon the world."

As Richard Shweder, one of the major proponents of the field, writes, "Cultural psychology is the study of how cultural traditions and social practices regulate, express, and transform the human psyche. This results less in psychic unity for humankind than in ethnic divergences in mind, self, and emotion."

== History ==
Yoshihisa Kashima talks about cultural psychology in two senses, as a tradition and as a movement that emerged in the late 20th century. Cultural psychology as a tradition is traced back to Western Romanticism in the 19th century. Giambatista Vico and Herder are seen as important early inspirations in thinking about the influence of culture on people.

Its institutional origin started with the publication of the Zeitschrift für Völkerpsychologie und Sprachwissenschaft (Journal of Folk Psychology and Language Science, scholarly journal founded by Moritz Lazarus and Heymann Steinthal), first published in 1860. Wilhelm Wundt expanded on this concept, and his volumes on Völkerpsychologie are among the earliest accounts of a cultural perspective within the discipline of psychology. He saw Völkerpsychologie as a cultural-developmental discipline that studied higher psychological processes in their social context. The proposed methods were comparative and historical analyses.

Another early cultural framework is cultural-historical psychology which emerged in the 1920s. It is mostly associated with the Russian psychologists Vygotsky, Luria and Leont'ev. They claimed that human activity is always embedded in a specific social and historical context and should therefore not be isolated.

While in psychological research interest in culture had declined, in part due to the popularity of behaviorism in the US, some researchers in anthropology, like Margaret Mead, started to explore the interaction between culture and personality. In the 1970s-1980s, there was an increasing call for an interpretive turn in anthropology and psychology. Researchers were influenced by constructivist and relativist accounts of knowledge and argued that cultural differences should be understood within their contexts. This influence was an important factor in the emergence of the cultural psychology movement. Leading scholars of this movement were, among others, Richard Shweder and Clifford Richards. The launch of a new journal and the publication of multiple major works, like Shweder's Cultural Psychology and Cole's Cultural Psychology: A Once and Future Discipline helped to shape the direction of the movement.

== Relationships with other branches of psychology ==
Cultural psychology is often confused with cross-cultural psychology. Even though both fields influence each other, cultural psychology is distinct from cross-cultural psychology in that cross-cultural psychologists generally use culture as a means of testing the universality of psychological processes rather than determining how local cultural practices shape psychological processes. So, whereas a cross-cultural psychologist might ask whether Jean Piaget's stages of development are universal across a variety of cultures, a cultural psychologist would be interested in how the social practices of a particular set of cultures shape the development of cognitive processes in different ways.

Cultural psychology research informs and is informed by several fields within psychology, including cross-cultural psychology, social psychology, cultural-historical psychology, developmental psychology, and cognitive psychology. In addition to drawing from several other fields of psychology, cultural psychology in particular utilizes anthropologists, linguists, and philosophers to help in the pursuit of understanding a wide variety of cultural facets in a society. However, the constructivist perspective of cultural psychology, through which cultural psychologists study thought patterns and behaviors within and across cultures, tends to clash with the universal perspectives common in most fields of psychology, which seek to qualify fundamental psychological truths that are consistent across all of humanity.

Cultural psychology is closely related to the emerging field of historical psychology, which investigates the dynamic relationship between history and psychology. This field seeks to understand how collective behaviors, emotions, and cognitions change over historical periods, and how contemporary psychological processes are shaped by long-standing cultural and historical influences.

== Importance ==
=== Need for expanded cultural research ===
According to Richard Shweder, there has been repeated failure to replicate Western psychology laboratory findings in non-Western settings. Therefore, a major goal of cultural psychology is to have many and varied cultures contribute to basic psychological theories in order to correct these theories so that they become more relevant to the predictions, descriptions, and explanations of all human behaviors, not just Western ones. This goal is shared by many of the scholars who promote the indigenous psychology approach. In an attempt to show the interrelated interests of cultural and indigenous psychology, cultural psychologist Pradeep Chakkarath emphasizes that international mainstream psychology, as it has been exported to most regions of the world by the so-called West, is only one among many indigenous psychologies and therefore may not have enough intercultural expertise to claim, as it frequently does, that its theories have universal validity. Accordingly, cultural groups have diverse ways of defining emotional problems, as well as distinguishing between physical and mental distress. For example, Arthur Kleinman has shown how the notion of depression in Chinese culture has been associated with physiological problems, before becoming acknowledged more recently as an emotional concern. Furthermore, the type of therapy people pursue is influenced by cultural conceptions of privacy and shame, as well as the stigmas associated with specific problems.

The acronym W.E.I.R.D. describes populations that are Western, Educated, Industrialized, Rich, and Democratic. Thus far, W.E.I.R.D. populations have been vastly overrepresented in psychological research. In an analysis of top journals in the psychology discipline, it was found that 96% of subjects who participated in those studies came from Western Industrialized countries, with 68% of them coming from the United States. This is largely because 99% of the authors of these journals were at Western Universities with 73% of them at American Universities. With this information, it is concluded that 96% of psychological findings come from W.E.I.R.D. countries. Findings from psychology research utilizing primarily W.E.I.R.D. populations are often labeled as universal theories and are inaccurately applied to other cultures.

Recent research is showing that cultures differ in many areas, such as logical reasoning and social values. The evidence that basic cognitive and motivational processes vary across populations has become increasingly difficult to ignore. For example, many studies have shown that Americans, Canadians and western Europeans rely on analytical reasoning strategies, which separate objects from their contexts to explain and predict behavior. Social psychologists refer to the "fundamental attribution error" or the tendency to explain people's behavior in terms of internal, inherent personality traits rather than external, situational considerations (e.g. attributing an instance of angry behavior to an angry personality). Outside W.E.I.R.D. cultures, however, this phenomenon is less prominent, as many non-W.E.I.R.D. populations tend to pay more attention to the context in which behavior occurs. Asians tend to reason holistically, for example by considering people's behavior in terms of their situation; someone's anger might be viewed as simply a result of an irritating day. Yet many long-standing theories of how humans think rely on the prominence of analytical thought.

By studying only W.E.I.R.D. populations, psychologists fail to account for a substantial amount of diversity of the global population as W.E.I.R.D. countries only represent 12% of the world's population. Applying the findings from W.E.I.R.D. populations to other populations can lead to a miscalculation of psychological theories and may hinder psychologists' abilities to isolate fundamental cultural characteristics.

== Mutual constitution ==
Mutual constitution is the concept that individuals and society mutually influence one another. Since societies are composed of individuals, the behaviors and actions of individuals affect the broader society. Conversely, societal values, norms, and ways of life shape the development of individuals. The social environment plays a key role in determining individual growth and behavior. Mutual constitution is often described as a cyclical model in which individuals and society continuously influence each other.

While cultural psychology is reliant on this model, societies often fail to recognize this. Despite the overwhelming acceptance that people affect culture and that culture affects people, societal systems tend to minimize the effect that people form on their communities. For example, mission statements of businesses, schools, and foundations attempt to make promises regarding the environment and values that their establishment holds. However, these promises cannot be made in accordance with the mutually consisting theory without being upheld by all participants. The mission statement for the employees of Southwest Airlines, for example, claims that, "...We are committed to provide our Employees a stable work environment with equal opportunity for learning and personal growth". While the company can ensure the "equal opportunity for learning and personal growth", the aforementioned message cannot be promised. The work environment that Southwest provides includes paying consumers. While rules can be enforced to ensure safety on their aircraft, customers will not be removed due to attitude or a lack of courtesy. This therefore contradicts the promise of a "stable work environment". On the contrary, some establishments do ensure that their mission statements agree with the mutually consistent model. For example, Yale University promises within its mission statement that:

Yale is committed to improving the world today and for future generations through outstanding research and scholarship, education, preservation, and practice. Yale educates aspiring leaders worldwide who serve all sectors of society. We carry out this mission through the free exchange of ideas in an ethical, interdependent, and diverse community of faculty, staff, students, and alumni.

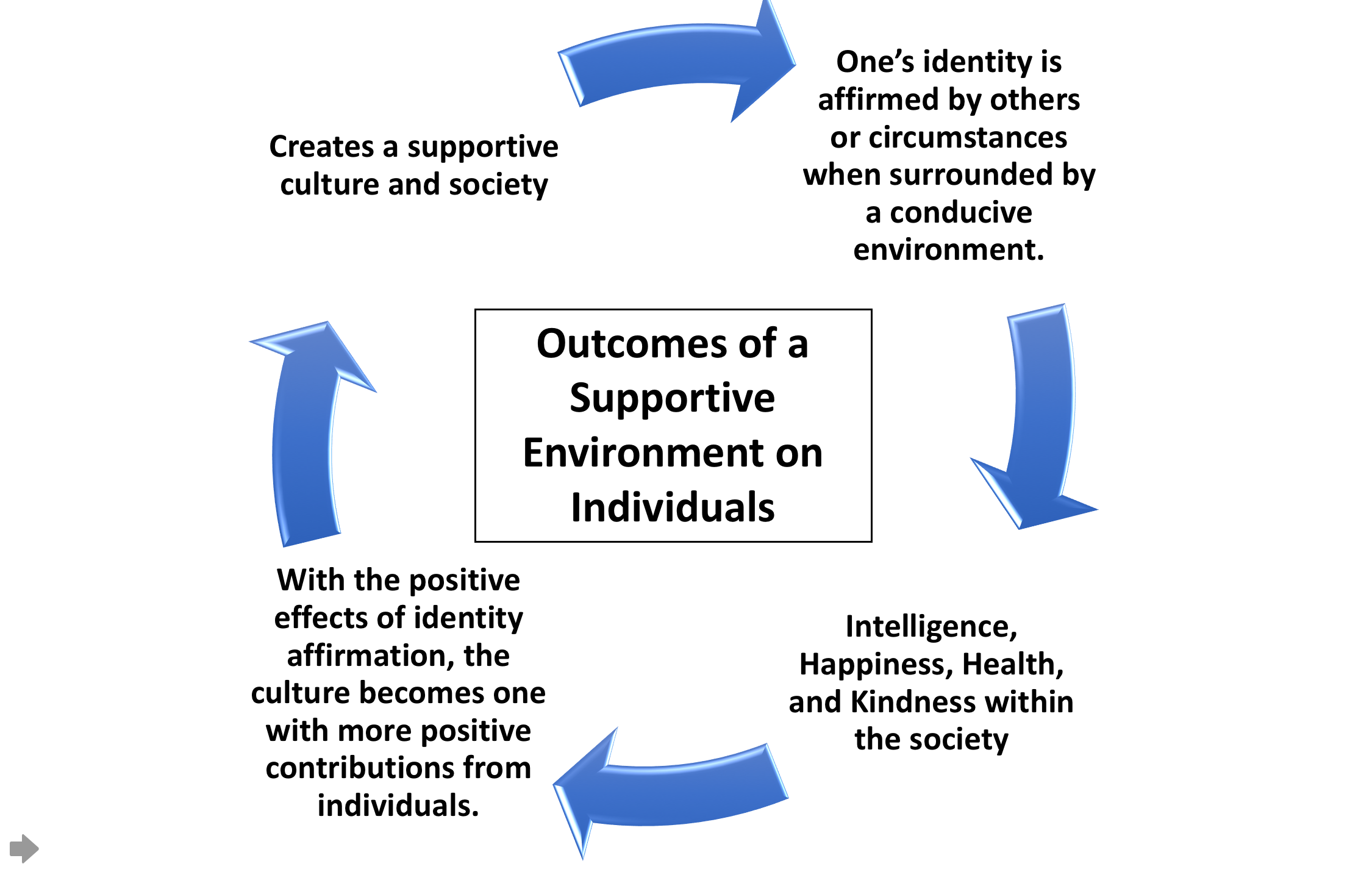
This image is a representation derived from ideas found in the journal article "Cultures and Selves: A Cycle of Mutual Constitution" by Hazel Rose Markus and Shinobu Kitayama.

Instead of making promises that depend on all of their students and faculty, they make statements that can refer to only a part of their student/ faculty body. The statement focuses more on what they offer, and how they uphold these promises. By providing evidence they provide readers with an example as to how their school community members participate in the environment they promise, accepting the community's role in their school culture.

Past research has been conducted by middle-class North Americans analyzing culturally different societies by using comparisons mostly involving middle-class North Americans and/or aforementioned W.E.I.R.D. societies. What has been characterized as Euro-American centrism, resulted in a great volume of research for this specific selection of humans. It has also allowed us to divert from the idea that certain psychological processes can be considered basic or universal, and recognize humans' remarkable capacity to create cultures and then be shaped by them. Although cultural psychology has internalized the mutually constituting model, further implementation in our society is necessary. Being aware of this model promotes taking responsibility for one's actions and the effect that their actions have on their community. Through acceptance of ones responsibilities and conscious application, communities have opportunities for improvement which in turn supports the individuals within the community. These ideas can be found in the journal article "Cultures and Selves: A Cycle of Mutual Constitution" by Hazel Rose Markus and Shinobu Kitayama which are also represented in the graphic provided.

== Criticisms ==
=== Stereotyping ===
One of the most significant themes in recent years has been cultural differences between East Asians and North Americans in attention, perception, cognition, and social psychological phenomena such as the self. Some psychologists, such as Turiel, have argued that this research is based on cultural stereotyping. Psychologist Per Gjerde states that cultural psychology tends to "generalize about human development across nations and continents" and assigning characteristics to a culture promotes a disregard for heterogeneity and minimizes the role of the individual. Gjerde argues that individuals develop multiple perspectives about their culture, sometimes act in accord with their culture without sharing cultural beliefs, and sometimes outright oppose their culture. Stereotyping thus views individuals as homogeneous products of culture.

However, many studies have looked at cultural differences in thought style between regions and nearby communities, such as between rice-farming and wheat-farming regions in China, farming and herding villages in Turkey, and social class differences within the United States and China.

=== Faulty methodology ===
Self-reporting data is one of the easiest and most accessible methods of mass data collection, especially in cultural psychology. However, overemphasizing cross-cultural comparisons of self-reported attitudes and values can lead to relatively unstable and ultimately misleading data. For this reason, cultural psychologists often use non-self-report methods, such as cognitive tasks, behavioral data, and use of natural language.

== Methods ==
Cultural psychologist, Richard Shweder argues that the psyche and culture are mutually constructed and inseparable. The failure of replicating many psychology findings in other regions of the world supported the idea that the mind and environment are interdependent and different throughout the world. Some criticisms state that using self-report may be a relatively unreliable method, and could be misleading especially in different cultural contexts. Regardless of the fact that self-report is an important way to obtain mass data, it is not the only way.

In fact, cultural psychologists utilized multiple measurements and resources no different from other scientific researches – observation, experiment, data analysis etc. For example, Nisbett & Cohen (1996) investigated the relation between historical cultural background and regional aggression difference in the U.S. In this study, researchers designed laboratory experiment to observe participants' aggression, and crime rate, demographic statistics were analyzed. The experiment results supported the culture of honor theory that the aggression is a defense mechanism which is rooted in the herding cultural origin for most of the southerners. In laboratory observations, Heine and his colleagues found that Japanese students spend more time than American students on tasks that they did poorly on, and the finding presents a self-improvement motivation often seen in East Asian that failure and success is interconvertible with effort. In terms of cognition styles, Chinese tend to perceive image using a holistic view compared to American.

Quantitative statistics of cultural products revealed that public media in western countries promote more individualistic components than East-Asian countries. These statistics are objective because it does not involve having people fill out questionnaire, instead, psychologists use physical measurements to quantitatively collect data about culture products, such as painting and photos. These statistics data can also be national records, for example, Chiao & Blizinsky (2010) revealed that cultures of high collectivism is associated with lower prevalence of mood/anxiety disorders in study involving 29 countries. In addition to the experimental and statistics data, evidence from neuro-imaging studies, also help strengthen the reliability of cultural psychology research. For example, when thinking of mother, the brain region related to self-concept showed significant activation in Chinese, whereas no activation observed in Westerners.

== Cultural models ==
To understand the social world, people may use cultural models, which "consist of culturally derived ideas and practices that are embodied, enacted, or instituted in everyday life." Cultural psychologists develop models to categorize cultural phenomena.

=== 4 I's culture cycle ===
The 4 I's cultural model was developed by Hazel Rose Markus and Alana Conner in their book Clash! 8 Cultural Conflicts That Make Us Who We Are. In it, they refer to the mutually constitutive nature of culture and individual as a "culture cycle". The culture cycle consists of four layers (Individuals, Interactions, Institutions, Ideas) of cultural influence that help to explain the interaction between self and culture.

==== Individuals ====
The first "I" concerns how an individual thinks about and expresses itself. Studies show that in the United States, individuals are more likely think of themselves as "independent", "equal", and "individualistic". Individuals have characteristics that are consistent across time and situation. When asked to describe themselves, Americans are likely to use adjectives to describe their personalities, such as "energetic", "friendly", or "hard-working". In Japan, studies show that individuals are more likely to think of themselves as "obligated to society", "interdependent", and "considerate". The self is adaptable to the situation. Japanese individuals are therefore more likely to describe themselves in relation to others, such as "I try not to upset anyone," or "I am a father, a son, and a brother."

==== Interactions ====
Interactions with other people and products reinforce cultural behaviors on a daily basis. Stories, songs, architecture, and advertisements are all methods of interaction that guide individuals in a culture to promote certain values and teach them how to behave. For example, in Japan, no-smoking signs emphasize the impact that smoke has on others by illustrating the path of smoke as it affects surrounding people. In the US, no-smoking signs focus on individual action by simply saying "No Smoking". These signs reflect underlying cultural norms and values, and when people see them they are encouraged to behave in accordance with the greater cultural values.

==== Institutions ====
The next layer of culture is made up of the institutions in which everyday interactions take place. These determine and enforce the rules for a society and include legal, government, economic, scientific, philosophical, and religious bodies. Institutions encourage certain practices and products while discouraging others. In Japanese kindergartens, children learn about important cultural values such as teamwork, group harmony, and cooperation. During "birthday month celebration," for example, the class celebrates all the children who have birthdays that month. This institutional practice underscores the importance of a group over an individual. In US kindergartens, children learn their personal value when they celebrate their birthdays one by one, enforcing the cultural value of uniqueness and individualism. Everyday institutional practices such as classroom birthday celebrations propagate prominent cultural themes.

Ideas

The final cycle, which houses the highest and most abstract idea level of the cycle, focuses on the big ideas that each culture has which answers the big questions of life, such as Why are we here, where did we come from, and where are we going. The culture around the ideas is what gives structure to the answers and allows for a greater understanding of what is believed. In their book Hazel and Alana say, "In charting the course of your self, your postal code is just as important as your genetic code". The culture of the idea is just as important as the idea itself.

=== Whiting model ===
John and Beatrice Whiting, along with their research students at Harvard University, developed the "Whiting model" for child development during the 1970s and 1980s, which specifically focused on how culture influences development.

The Whitings coined the term "cultural learning environment", to describe the surroundings that influence a child during development. Beatrice Whiting defined a child's environmental contexts as being "characterized by an activity in progress, a physically defined space, a characteristic group of people, and norms of behavior". This environment is composed of several layers. A child's geographical context influences the history/anthropology of their greater community. This results in maintenance systems (i.e., sociological characteristics) that form a cultural learning environment. These factors inform learned behavior, or progressive expressive systems that take the form of religion, magic beliefs, ritual and ceremony, art, recreation, games and play, or crime rates.

Many researchers have expanded upon the Whiting model, and the Whiting model's influence is clear in both modern psychology and anthropology. According to an article by Thomas Weisner in the Journal of Cross-Cultural Psychology, "All these [more recent] approaches share a common intellectual project: to take culture and context deeply and seriously into account in studies of human development."

== Culture and motivation ==
=== Self-enhancement vs. self-improvement ===
While self-enhancement is a person's motivation to view themselves positively, self-improvement is a person's motivation to have others view themselves positively. The distinction between the two modes of life is most evident between independent and collectivistic cultures. Cultures with independent self-views (the premise that people see themselves as self-contained entities) often emphasize self-esteem, confidence in one's own worth and abilities. With self-esteem seen as a main source of happiness in Western cultures, the motivation to self-enhance generally follows as a way to maintain one's positive view about oneself. Some strategies employed when self-enhancing often include downward social comparison, compensatory self-enhancement, discounting, external attributions and basking in reflected glory. In contrast, collectivistic cultures often emphasize self-improvement as a leading motivating factor in their lives. This motivation is often derived from a desire to not lose face and to appear positively among social groups.

== Culture and empathy ==
=== Cultural orientation: collectivistic and individualistic ===
A main distinction to understand when looking at psychology and culture is the difference between individualistic and collectivistic cultures. People from an individualistic culture typically demonstrate an independent view of the self; the focus is usually on personal achievement. Members of a collectivistic society have more of a focus on the group (interdependent view of self), usually focusing on things that will benefit the group. Research has shown such differences of the self when comparing collectivistic and individualistic cultures: The Fundamental Attribution Error has been shown to be more common in America (individualistic) as compared to in India (collectivistic). Along these same lines, the self-serving bias was again shown as more common among Americans than Japanese individuals. This can be seen in a study involving an animation of fish, wherein Western viewers interpreted the scene of a fish swimming away from a school as an expression of individualism and independence, while Eastern individuals wondered what was wrong with the singular fish and concluded that the school had kicked it out. Another study showed that in coverage of the same instance of violent crime, Western news focused on innate character flaws and the failings of the individual while Chinese news pointed out the lack of relationships of the perpetrator in a foreign environment and the failings of society. This is not to imply that collectivism and individualism are completely dichotomous, but these two cultural orientations are to be understood more so as a spectrum. Each representation is at either end; thus, some members of individualistic cultures may hold collectivistic values, and some collectivistic individual may hold some individualist values. The concepts of collectivism and individualism show a general idea of the values of a specific ethnic culture but should not be juxtaposed in competition.

=== Empathy across cultures ===
These differences in values across cultures suggests that understanding and expressing empathy may be manifested differently throughout varying cultures. Duan and Hill first discussed empathy in subcategories of intellectual empathy: taking on someone's thoughts/perspective, also known as cognitive empathy and emotional empathy: taking on someone's feeling/experience. Duan, Wei, and Wang furthered this idea to include empathy in terms of being either dispositional (capacity for noticing/understanding empathy) or experiential (specific to a certain context or situation, observing the person and empathizing). This created four types of empathy to further examine: 1) dispositional intellectual empathy; 2) dispositional empathic emotion; 3) experienced intellectual empathy; and 4) experienced empathic emotion. These four branches allowed researchers to examine empathic proclivities among individuals of different cultures. While individualism was not shown to correlate with either types of dispositional empathy, collectivism was shown to have a direct correlation with both types of dispositional empathy, possibly suggesting that by having less focus on the self, there is more capacity towards noticing the needs of others. More so, individualism predicted experienced intellectual empathy, and collectivism predicted experienced empathic emotion. These results are congruent with the values of collectivistic and individualistic societies. The self-centered identity and egoistic motives prevalent in individualistic cultures perhaps acts as a hindrance in being open to (fully) experiencing empathy. Many individuals tend to harbor dislike towards those from different cultural backgrounds, often fixating on these differences. Failing to comprehend the diversity of others significantly impedes our understanding of their lives. This may happen as a result of unawareness when an individual is behaving in such way.

=== Intercultural and ethnocultural empathy ===
Cultural empathy became broadly understood as concurrent understanding and acceptance of a culture different from one's own. This idea has been further developed with the concept of ethnocultural empathy. This moves beyond merely accepting and understanding another culture, and also includes acknowledging how the values of a culture may affect empathy. This idea is meant to foster cultural empathy as well as engender cultural competence. One of the greatest barriers of empathy between cultures is people's tendency to operate from an ethnocentric point of view. Eysenck conceptualized ethnocentrism as using one's own culture to understand the rest of the world, while holding one's own values as correct. Concomitant with this barrier to intercultural empathy, Rasoal, Eklund, and Hansen posit five hindrances of intercultural empathy; these include:

Paucity of:

- (general) knowledge outside one's own culture
- (general) experience with other cultures outside one's own
- (specific) knowledge regarding other people's cultures
- (specific) experiences regarding other people's cultures

and:

- inability to bridge different cultures by understanding the commonalities and dissimilarities

These five points elucidate lack of both depth and breadth as hindrances in developing and practicing intercultural empathy.

Another barrier to intercultural empathy is that there is often a power dynamic between different cultures. Bridging an oppressed culture with their (upper-echelon) oppressor is a goal of intercultural empathy. One approach to this barrier is to attempt to acknowledge one's personal oppression. While this may be minimal in comparison to other people's oppression, it will still help with realizing that other people have been oppressed. The goal of bridging the gap should focus on building an alliance by finding the core commonalities of the human experience; this shows empathy to be a relational experience, not an independent one. Through this, the goal is that intercultural empathy can lend toward broader intercultural understanding across cultures and societies.

Four important facets of cultural empathy are:

- Taking the perspective of someone from a different culture
- Understanding the verbal/behavioral expression that occurs during ethnocultural empathy
- Being cognizant of how different cultures are treated by larger entities such as the job market and the media
- Accepting differences in cultural choices regarding language, clothing preference, food choice, etc.

These four aspects may be especially helpful for practicing cultural competence in a clinical setting. Given that most psychological practices were founded on the parochial ideals of Euro-American psychologists, cultural competence was not considered much of a necessity until said psychologists increasingly began seeing clients with different ethnic backgrounds. Many of the problems that contribute to therapy not being beneficial for people of color include; therapy having an individual focus, an emphasis on expressiveness, and an emphasis on openness. For more on intercultural competence, see intercultural competence.

=== Cultural Influences in the mental health treatment ===
In some studies, there has been a correlation between client comfort and their therapists sharing a similar ethnicity. This occurs because the client may feel more at ease or feel a stronger sense of connection with their therapists. From 2010 through 2015 there was a research study that concluded how important it is to have a variety of mental health care professionals in the work setting. However, it is also true that the primary demographic receiving more mental health services compromises the majority population. This reflects the lack of universal accessibility to mental health care. In the past years, we have observed an increase in validation and understanding of cultural psychology in the many aspects of life.

== Nijmegen school ==
Already in 1956 the department of cultural psychology and psychology of religion was founded at the Radboud University of Nijmegen, the Netherlands. One of its aims was to study culture and religion as psychological phenomena. In 1986 the department was split up in a Psychology of Religion section and a Cultural Psychology section. The research aim of the latter was to study culture as a behavior regulating system, which in fact implied that culture was no longer seen as an explanatory concept, but as something to be explained. Instead of viewing culture as a domain in its own right, as something separate from individual human beings, culture was seen as the product of human interaction leading to patterned behavior characteristic of human groups. It looks so self-evident, but this shift has wide-reaching implications. The expression: "culture of...." – and one can fill in whatever nation or group – can no longer be used to explain behaviors. One has to look for other determinants of behavior than the ones associated with 'culture'. Expressions like: 'it is our culture to put women in a dependent position and men above them' can no longer be used. Such a way of reasoning obscures the real determinants of the behavioral patterning that causes this sex and gender related state of affairs. The main publication in the department in which this view is elaborated is the book Culture as Embodiment. In this book a tool kit is presented, which can be helpful in replacing the idea of culture as an explanatory variable with concepts and research instruments by means of which the behavioral patterning can be understood much better.

In 2020 an empirical program was launched by Ernst Graamans in his book Beyond the Idea of Culture: Understanding and Changing Cultural Practices in Business and Life Matters. This dissertation at the Amsterdam Free University Business School of Economics explores so called 'cultural change' and related practices in business boardrooms, institutions of care, but also in the customs of female sexual mutilation in African communities. The defence of these practices in terms of: "it is our culture" is cogently criticized. In cases of communal female circumcision practices this empirical program makes the replacement of these practices by alternative rituals more viable.

== Research institutions ==
- Institute of Cultural Psychology and Qualitative Social Research (ikus)
- Institute of Psychology, Sigmund Freud University Vienna
- Laboratory of Comparative Human Cognition (LCHC)
- Culture and Cognition, University of Michigan
- Centre for Cultural Psychology, Aalborg University
- Hans Kilian and Lotte Köhler Center for Cultural Psychology and Historical Anthropology (KKC)
- Culture and Self Lab, University of British Columbia

== See also ==
- Cultural-historical activity theory
- Indian psychology
