= Geist =

Philosophical concept of "spirit"

Geist (German: [ˈɡaɪst]) is a German noun with a significant degree of importance in German philosophy. Geist can be roughly translated into three English meanings: ghost (as in the supernatural entity), spirit (as in the Holy Spirit), and mind or intellect. Some English translators resort to using "spirit/mind" or "spirit (mind)" to help convey the meaning of the term.

Geist is also a central concept in Georg Wilhelm Friedrich Hegel's 1807 The Phenomenology of Spirit (Phänomenologie des Geistes). Notable compounds, all associated with Hegel's view of world history of the late 18th century, include Weltgeist (German: [ˈvɛltˌɡaɪ̯st], "world-spirit"), Volksgeist ("national spirit") and Zeitgeist ("spirit of the age").

== Etymology and translation ==
German Geist (masculine gender: der Geist) continues Old High German geist, attested as the translation of Latin spiritus. It is the direct cognate of English ghost, from a West Germanic gaistaz. Its derivation from a PIE root g̑heis- "to be agitated, frightened" suggests that the Germanic word originally referred to frightening (cf. English ghastly) apparitions or ghosts, and may also have carried the connotation of "ecstatic agitation, furor" related to the cult of Germanic Mercury. As the translation of biblical Latin spiritus (Greek πνεῦμα) "spirit, breath" the Germanic word acquires a Christian meaning from an early time, notably in reference to the Holy Spirit (Old English sē hālga gāst "the Holy Ghost", OHG ther heilago geist, Modern German der Heilige Geist). Poltergeist (Noisy/Disruptive Geist) is a common interchangeable term. The English word is in competition with Latinate spirit from the Middle English period, but its broader meaning is preserved well into the early modern period.

The German noun much like English spirit could refer to spooks or ghostly apparitions of the dead, to the religious concept, as in the Holy Spirit, as well as to the "spirit of wine", i.e., ethanol. However, its special meaning of "mind, intellect" never shared by English ghost is acquired only in the 18th century, under the influence of French esprit. In this sense it became extremely productive in the German language of the 18th century in general as well as in 18th-century German philosophy. Geist could now refer to the quality of intellectual brilliance, to wit, innovation, erudition, etc. It is also in this time that the adjectival distinction of geistlich "spiritual, pertaining to religion" vs. geistig "intellectual, pertaining to the mind" begins to be made. Reference to spooks or ghosts is made by the adjective geisterhaft "ghostly, spectral".

Numerous compounds are formed in the 18th to 19th centuries, some of them loan translations of French expressions, such as Geistesgegenwart = présence d'esprit ("mental presence, acuity"), Geistesabwesenheit = absence d’esprit ("mental absence, distraction"), geisteskrank "mentally ill", geistreich "witty, intellectually brilliant", geistlos "unintelligent, unimaginative, vacuous" etc. It is from these developments that certain German compounds containing -geist have been loaned into English, such as Zeitgeist.

German Geist in this particular sense of "mind, wit, erudition; intangible essence, spirit" has no precise English-language equivalent, for which reason translators sometimes retain Geist as a German loanword.

There is a second word for ghost in German: das Gespenst (neutral gender). Der Geist is used slightly more often to refer to a ghost (in the sense of flying white creature) than das Gespenst. The corresponding adjectives are gespenstisch ("ghostly", "spooky") and gespensterhaft ("ghost-like"). A Gespenst is described in German as spukender Totengeist, a "spooking ghost of the dead". The adjectives geistig and geistlich on the other hand, can not be used to describe something spooky, as geistig means "mental", and geistlich means either "spiritual" or refers to employees of the church. Geisterhaft would also mean, like gespensterhaft, "ghost-like". While "spook" means der Spuk (male gender), the adjective of this word is only used in its English form, spooky. The more common German adjective would be gruselig, deriving from der Grusel (das ist gruselig, colloquially: das ist spooky, meaning "that is spooky").

== Hegelianism ==
Geist is a central concept in Hegel's philosophy. According to most interpretations, the Weltgeist ("world spirit") is not an actual object or a transcendent, godlike thing, but a means of philosophizing about history. Weltgeist is effected in history through the mediation of various Volksgeister ("national spirits"), the great men of history, such as Napoleon, are the "concrete universal".

This has led some to claim that Hegel favored the great man theory, although his philosophy of history, in particular concerning the role of the "universal state" (Universalstaat, which means a universal "order" or "statute" rather than "state"), and of an "End of History" is much more complex.

For Hegel, the great hero is unwittingly utilized by Geist or absolute spirit, by a "ruse of reason" as he puts it, and is irrelevant to history once his historic mission is accomplished; he is thus subjected to the teleological principle of history, a principle which allows Hegel to reread the history of philosophy as culminating in his philosophy of history.

== Weltgeist ==
Weltgeist ("world-spirit") is older than the 18th century, at first (16th century) in the sense of "secularism, impiety, irreligiosity" (spiritus mundi), in the 17th century also personalised in the sense of "man of the world", "mundane or secular person". Also from the 17th century, Weltgeist acquired a philosophical or spiritual sense of "world-spirit" or "world-soul" (anima mundi, spiritus universi) in the sense of Panentheism, a spiritual essence permeating all of nature, or the active principle animating the universe, including the physical sense, such as the attraction between magnet and iron or between Moon and tide.

This idea of Weltgeist in the sense of anima mundi became very influential in 18th-century German philosophy. In philosophical contexts, der Geist on its own could refer to this concept, as in Christian Thomasius, Versuch vom Wesen des Geistes (1709). Belief in a Weltgeist as animating principle immanent to the universe became dominant in German thought due to the influence of Goethe, in the later part of the 18th century.

Already in the poetical language of Johann Ulrich von König (d. 1745), the Weltgeist appears as the active, masculine principle opposite the feminine principle of Nature. Weltgeist in the sense of Goethe comes close to being a synonym of God and can be attributed agency and will. Herder, who tended to prefer the form Weltengeist (as it were "spirit of worlds"), pushes this to the point of composing prayers addressed to this world-spirit:

O Weltengeist, Bist du so gütig, wie du mächtig bist, Enthülle mir, den du mitfühlend zwar, Und doch so grausam schufst, erkläre mir Das Loos der Fühlenden, die durch mich leiden.
"O World-spirit, be as benevolent as you are powerful and reveal to me, whom you have created with compassion and yet cruelly, explain to me the lot of the sentient, who suffer through me"

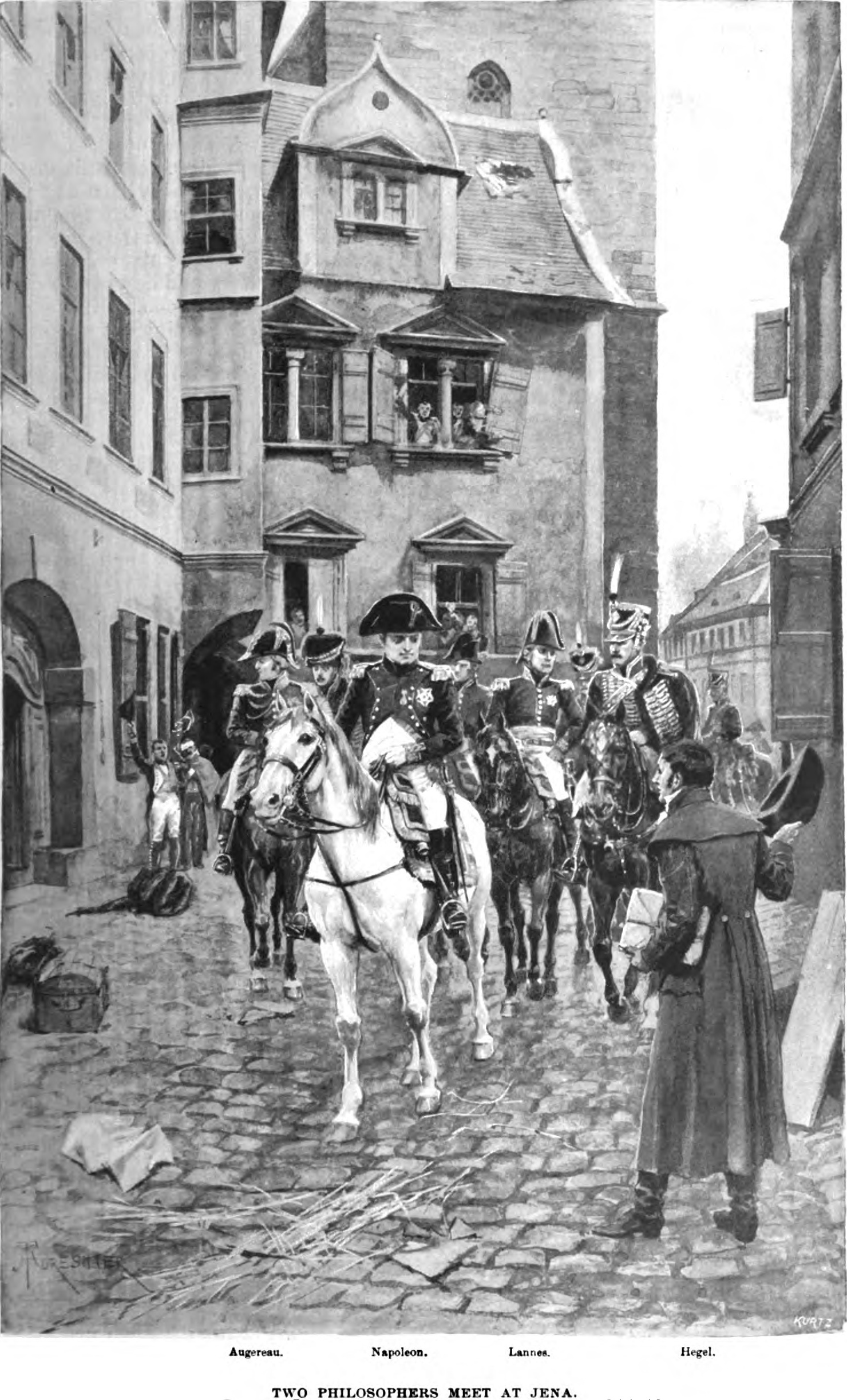
"Hegel and Napoleon in Jena" (illustration from Harper's Magazine, 1895)

The term was notably embraced by Hegel and his followers in the early 19th century. For the 19th century, the term as used by Hegel (1807) became prevalent, less in the sense of an animating principle of nature or the universe but as the invisible force advancing world history:

"In the course of history one relevant factor is the preservation of a nation [...] while the other factor is that the continued existence of a national spirit [Volksgeist] is interrupted because it has exhausted and spent itself, so that world history, the world spirit [Weltgeist], proceeds."

Hegel's description of Napoleon as "the world-soul on horseback" (die Weltseele zu Pferde) became proverbial. The phrase is a shortened paraphrase of Hegel's words in a letter written on 13 October 1806, the day before the Battle of Jena, to his friend Friedrich Immanuel Niethammer:

I saw the Emperor – this world-soul – riding out of the city on reconnaissance. It is indeed a wonderful sensation to see such an individual, who, concentrated here at a single point, astride a horse, reaches out over the world and masters it.

The letter was not published in Hegel's time, but the expression was attributed to Hegel anecdotally, appearing in print from 1859. It is used without attribution by Meyer Kayserling in his Sephardim (1859:103), and is apparently not recognized as a reference to Hegel by the reviewer in Göttingische gelehrte Anzeigen, who notes it disapprovingly, as one of Kayserling's "bad jokes" (schlechte Witze). The phrase became widely associated with Hegel later in the 19th century. Weltgeist is distinct from Weltseele ("World Soul") .

== Volksgeist ==
Volksgeist or Nationalgeist refers to a "spirit" of an individual people (Volk), its "national spirit" or "national character". The term Nationalgeist is used in the 1760s by Justus Möser and by Johann Gottfried Herder. The term Nation at this time is used in the sense of natio "nation, ethnic group, race", mostly replaced by the term Volk after 1800. In the early 19th century, the term Volksgeist was used by Friedrich Carl von Savigny in order to express the "popular" sense of justice. Savigniy explicitly referred to the concept of an esprit des nations used by Voltaire. and of the esprit général invoked by Montesquieu.

Hegel uses the term in his Lectures on the Philosophy of History. Based on the Hegelian use of the term, Wilhelm Wundt, Moritz Lazarus and Heymann Steinthal in the mid-19th-century established the field of Völkerpsychologie ("psychology of nations"). In Germany, the concept of Volksgeist has developed and changed its meaning through eras and fields. The most important examples are: In the literary field, Schlegel and the Brothers Grimm; in the history of cultures, Herder; in the history of the State or political history, Hegel; in the field of law, Savigny; and in the field of psychology Wundt. This means that the concept is ambiguous. Furthermore it is not limited to Romanticism as it is commonly known.

The concept of was also influential in American cultural anthropology. According to the historian of anthropology George W. Stocking, Jr., "... one may trace the later American anthropological idea of culture back through Bastian's Volkergedanken and the folk psychologist's Volksgeister to Wilhelm von Humboldt's Nationalcharakter – and behind that, although not without a paradoxical and portentous residue of conceptual and ideological ambiguity, to the Herderian ideal of Volksgeist."

== Zeitgeist ==
The compound Zeitgeist (/ˈzaɪtɡaɪst/; "spirit of the age" or "spirit of the times") similarly to Weltgeist describes an invisible agent or force dominating the characteristics of a given epoch in world history. The term is now mostly associated with Hegel, contrasting with Hegel's use of Volksgeist "national spirit" and Weltgeist "world-spirit", but its coinage and popularization precedes Hegel, and is mostly due to Herder and Goethe.

Hegel in Phenomenology of the Spirit (1807) uses both Weltgeist and Volksgeist but prefers the phrase Geist der Zeiten "spirit of the times" over the compound Zeitgeist. Hegel believed that culture and art reflected its time. Thus, he argued that it would be impossible to produce classical art in the modern world, as modernity is essentially a "free and ethical culture".

The term has also been used more widely in the sense of an intellectual or aesthetic fashion or fad. For example, Charles Darwin's 1859 proposition that evolution occurs by natural selection has been cited as a case of the zeitgeist of the epoch, an idea "whose time had come", seeing that his contemporary, Alfred Russel Wallace, was outlining similar models during the same period. Similarly, intellectual fashions such as the emergence of logical positivism in the 1920s, leading to a focus on behaviorism and blank-slatism over the following decades, and later, during the 1950s to 1960s, the shift from behaviorism to post-modernism and critical theory can be argued to be an expression of the intellectual or academic "zeitgeist". Zeitgeist in more recent usage has been used by Forsyth (2009) in reference to his "theory of leadership" and in other publications describing models of business or industry. Canadian journalist Malcolm Gladwell argued in his book Outliers that entrepreneurs who succeeded in the early stages of a nascent industry often share similar characteristics.

The term as used contemporarily may more pragmatically refer to a fashion or fad which prescribes what is acceptable or tasteful, e.g. in the field of architecture.

== See also ==
- Max Stirner – German philosopher (1806–1856)
- Hauntology

== Sources ==
- Of Spirit: Heidegger and the Question, by Jacques Derrida. Translation by Geoffrey Bennington & Rachel Bowlby, Chicago University Press, 1989 (ISBN 0-226-14317-1) and 1991 (ISBN 0-226-14319-8)
- Berlin, Isaiah: Vico and Herder. Two Studies in the History of Ideas, London, 1976.
- Stocking, George W. 1996. Volksgeist as Method and Ethic: Essays on Boasian Ethnography and the German Anthropological Tradition. ISBN 0-299-14554-9
