= Zeitgeist =

Philosophical and sociological concept meaning "spirit of the age"

In 18th- and 19th-century German philosophy, a Zeitgeist (German pronunciation: [ˈtsaɪtɡaɪst]; lit. 'spirit of the age'; capitalized in German) is a way of referring to the intellectual, cultural, ethical and political climate of a given epoch in world history. It is often described as an invisible agent, force, or daemon that seems to dominate the characteristics of a particular period. The term is usually associated with Georg W. F. Hegel, contrasting with Hegel's use of Volksgeist ("national spirit") and Weltgeist ("world-spirit"), although the word itself predates Hegel and was popularized by Johann Gottfried Herder and Johann Wolfgang von Goethe.

The expression belongs to a wider family of notions such as "spirit of the age", "spirit of the times" or genius saeculi ("spirit of the century"), which had circulated in Latin and the major European languages since the early modern period to express the idea that people's thoughts and actions are shaped by the social environment of their time rather than only by timeless truths or individual genius. In 1769 Herder translated the Latin phrase genius seculi used by the philologist Christian Adolph Klotz as Zeitgeist in his aesthetic essay Kritische Wälder, and the term was taken up in later discussions of philosophy of history and history of ideas. Other philosophers who were associated with related ideas include Herbert Spencer and Voltaire.

Contemporary use of the term sometimes, more colloquially, is similar to the Overton window in referring to a pattern of fashions or fads that prescribe what is considered to be acceptable or tasteful for an era: for example, in fields such as architecture, psychotherapy, journalism or popular culture. The term is widely used, often without translation, in many languages to denote the "spirit" or dominant climate of a particular period.

== Concept and uses ==
Writers in sociology, cultural history and social psychology often use Zeitgeist to describe a diffuse system of ideas, images and values that underpins the practices, behaviours and creations of a given period, shaping both individual lives and collective life while remaining only partly conscious to the actors involved. From this perspective, the Zeitgeist can be treated as an ideal type in the sense of Max Weber: an analytic construct that accentuates certain traits in order to make sense of a complex historical reality, while admitting internal diversity and conflict.

Because it names what appears self-evident or "in the air" at a given moment, the notion is often used critically. Historians and theorists have pointed out that appeals to the Zeitgeist can obscure social conflicts, overlook minority or dissident positions, or suggest a misleading uniformity in the culture of an age. Others have emphasized that describing the Zeitgeist of a period always involves an act of interpretation from a particular standpoint, and that competing accounts of an era's spirit may coexist.

== Theory of leadership ==
Hegel in Phenomenology of the Spirit (1807) uses both Weltgeist and Volksgeist, but prefers the phrase Geist der Zeiten "spirit of the times" over the compound Zeitgeist.

The Hegelian concept is in contrast to the Great Man theory propounded by Thomas Carlyle, which sees history as the result of the actions of heroes and geniuses. In contrast, Hegel perceived such "great men", specifically Napoleon, as the "embodiment of the world-spirit" (Die Weltseele zu Pferde "the world-soul on horseback"). Carlyle stresses that leaders do not become leaders by fate or accident. Instead, these individuals possess characteristics of great leaders and these characteristics allow them to obtain positions of power.

According to Hegel biographer D. R. Forsyth, Leo Tolstoy disagreed with Carlyle's perspective, instead believing that leadership, like other things, was a product of the "Zeitgeist", the social circumstances at the time.

The Great Man theory and the Zeitgeist theory may be included in two main areas of thought in psychology. For instance, Great Man theory is very similar to the trait approach. Trait researchers are interested in identifying the various personality traits that underline human behaviors such as conformity, leadership, or other social behaviors. Thus, they agree that leadership is primarily a quality of an individual and that some people are pre-dispositioned to be a leader whereas others are born to follow these leaders. In contrast, situationist researchers believe that social behavior is a product of society. That is, social influence is what determines human behaviors. Therefore, situationism is of the same opinion as Zeitgeist theory—leaders are created from the social environment and are molded from the situation. The concept of Zeitgeist also relates to the sociological tradition that stems from Émile Durkheim and recently developed into social capital theory as exemplified by the work of Patrick Hunout.

These two perspectives have been combined to create what is known as the interactional approach to leadership. This approach asserts that leadership is developed through the mixing of personality traits and the situation. Further, this approach was expressed by social psychologist Kurt Lewin by the equation B = f(P, E) where behavior (B) is a function (f) of the person (P) and the environment (E).

=== In self-help and business models ===
Executives, venture capitalists, journalists, and authors have argued that the idea of a Zeitgeist is useful in understanding the emergence of industries, simultaneous invention, and evaluating the relative value of innovations. Canadian journalist Malcolm Gladwell argued in his book, Outliers, that entrepreneurs who succeeded often share similar characteristics—early personal or significant exposure to knowledge and skills in the early stages of a nascent industry. He proposed that the timing of involvement in an industry, and often in sports as well, affected the probability of success. In Silicon Valley, a number of people (Peter Thiel, Alistair Davidson, Mac Levchin, Nicholas G. Carr, Vinod Khosla) have argued that much innovation has been shaped by easy access to the Internet, open source software, component technologies for both hardware and software (e.g., software libraries, software as a service), and the ability to reach narrow markets across a global market. Peter Thiel has commented: "There is so much incrementalism now."

In a Zeitgeist market, the number of new entrants is high, differentiation in high-value products (the strongest predictor of new product success) is more difficult to achieve, and business models emphasizing service and solution over product and process, will enhance success. Examples include innovation in product experience, legal rights and bundling, privacy rights, and agency (where businesses act on behalf of customers).

== Origin of the Concept ==
The term Zeitgeist emerged in eighteenth-century German philosophy.

It became closely associated with thinkers including:

- Johann Gottfried Herder
- Georg Wilhelm Friedrich Hegel

Herder argued that every civilization possesses its own unique cultural identity, while Hegel believed history unfolds through evolving ideas that shape societies.

Although neither philosopher developed an architectural theory of zeitgeist in the modern sense, their ideas were later applied by historians and architects to explain how architecture reflects the cultural, social, and intellectual conditions of its time. For a more detailed discussion of how the concept of Zeitgeist is understood in architecture, see this overview of Zeitgeist in architecture.

== Zeitgeist vs. Architectural Style ==
These terms are often confused.

Zeitgeist	Architectural Style
Explains why architecture changes	Describes how architecture looks
Intellectual concept	Visual language
Influenced by society	Influenced by design principles
Dynamic	Can persist for centuries
Includes technology and politics	Primarily concerns aesthetics and construction

For example:

Modernism is an architectural style.

Industrialization, new engineering methods, and post-war optimism represent the zeitgeist that produced Modernism.

== See also ==
- Geist – Philosophical concept of "spirit"
- Geisteswissenschaft – Set of human sciences
- Invisible hand – Concept in modern economics
- Multiple discovery – Hypothesis about scientific discoveries and inventions
- Era – Span of time defined for the purposes of chronology or historiography
- Paradigm – Set of distinct concepts or thought patterns
- Sociocultural system – Human population viewed in context
- World history (field) – Study of history from a global perspective

The Zeitgeist Movement
