= Valsiner =

Valsiner is an Estonian surname. Notable people with the surname include:

- Aleksander Valsiner (1903–1972), Estonian educator
- Jaan Valsiner (born 1951), Estonian-American professor
