= Ashis Nandy =

Indian political psychologist, social theorist, and critic

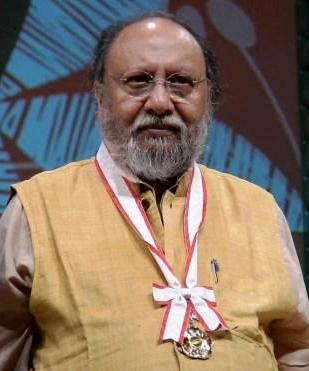
- Nandy receiving Fukuoka Asian Culture Prize in 2007, Japan
- Born: 13 May 1937 (age 89); Bhagalpur, Bihar, British India
- Education: Nagpur University (M.A.); Gujarat University (PhD)
- Occupations: political psychologist, social theorist, Former Director of CSDS Delhi
- Spouse: Uma Nandy
- Children: 1
- Relatives: Pritish Nandy (brother)
- Writing career
- Notable works: Traditions, Tyranny and Utopias; Alternative Sciences: Creativity and Authenticity in Two Indian Scientists; The Tao of Cricket: On Games of Destiny and the Destiny of Games; An Ambiguous Journey to the City: The Village and Other Odd Ruins of the Self in Indian Imagination; Time Warps; Romance of the State and the Fate of Dissent in the Tropics

Academic background
- Thesis: Role of a Valued Object in Personality: a Clinical Psychological Study of Money (1967)
- Doctoral advisor: P. H. Prabhu

Academic work
- Doctoral students: Tridip Suhrud

Ashis Nandy (born 13 May 1937) is an Indian political psychologist, social theorist, futurist and critic. A trained clinical psychologist, Nandy has provided theoretical critiques of European colonialism, development, modernity, secularism, Hindutva, science, technology, nuclearism, cosmopolitanism, and utopia. He has conceptualised cosmopolitanism and critical traditionalism. Nandy has written an historical profile of India's commercial cinema as well as critiques of state and violence.

He was Senior Fellow and Former Director of the Centre for the Study of Developing Societies (CSDS) for several years. Currently, he is a Senior Honorary Fellow at the CSDS apart from being the Chairperson of the Committee for Cultural Choices and Global Futures, New Delhi.

Nandy received the Fukuoka Asian Culture Prize in 2007. In 2008 he appeared on the list of the Top 100 Public Intellectuals Poll of the Foreign Policy magazine, published by The Carnegie Endowment for International Peace. He received the Hans Killian Award in 2019.

== Early life and education ==
Nandy was born in a Bengali Christian family at Bhagalpur, Bihar, in 1937. He is the eldest of three sons of Satish Chandra Nandy and Prafulla Nalini Nandy, and brother of Pritish Nandy. Later, his family moved to Calcutta. Nandy's mother was a teacher at La Martiniere School, Calcutta and subsequently became the school's first Indian vice principal. When he was 10, British India was partitioned into two sovereign countries – India and Pakistan. He witnessed the time of conflicts and atrocities that followed.

Nandy quit medical college after three years before joining Hislop College, Nagpur to study social sciences. Later he took a master's degree in sociology. However, his academic interest tended increasingly towards clinical psychology and he did his PhD in psychology at Dept. of Psychology, Gujarat University, Ahmedabad.

While a professed non-believer, Nandy identifies with the Bengali Christian community.

== Academic career ==
Nandy joined the Centre for the Study of Developing Societies (CSDS), Delhi, as a young faculty member. While working there, he developed his own methodology by integrating clinical psychology and sociology. Meanwhile, he was invited by a number of universities and research institutions abroad to carry out research and to give them lectures. He served as the Director of CSDS between 1992 and 1997. He also serves on the Editorial Collective of Public Culture, a reviewed journal published by Duke University Press.

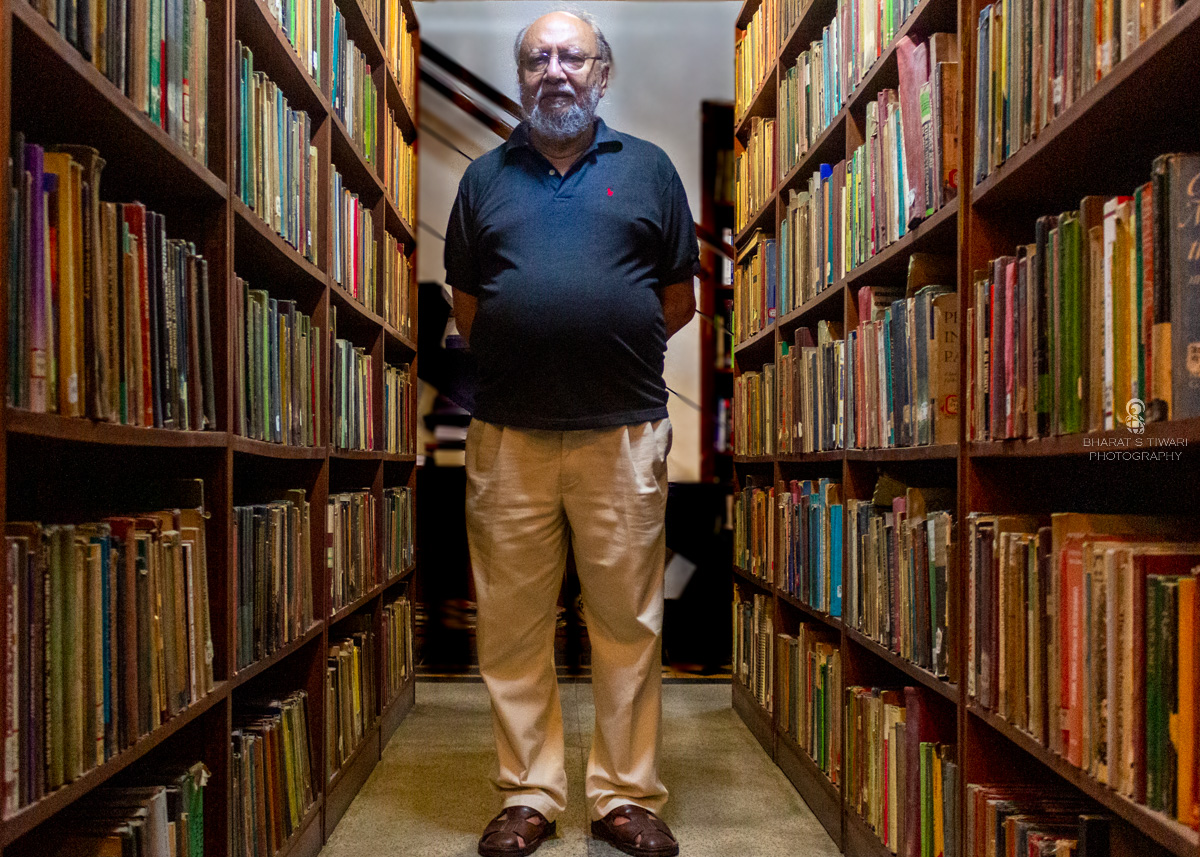
Ashish Nandy in the library of the CSDS.

Nandy has coauthored a number of human rights reports and is active in movements for peace, alternative sciences and technologies, and cultural survival. He is a member of the Executive Councils of the World Futures Studies Federation, the Commonwealth Human Rights Initiative, the International Network for Cultural Alternatives to Development, and the People's Union for Civil Liberties. Nandy has been a Woodrow Wilson Fellow at the Wilson Center, Washington, D.C., a Charles Wallace Fellow at the University of Hull, and a Fellow of the Institute for Advanced Studies in Humanities, University of Edinburgh. He held the first UNESCO Chair at the Center for European Studies, University of Trier, in 1994. In 2006 he became the National Fellow of the Indian Council of Social Science Research.

Nandy has explored a range of issues across politics, psychology, and society in his academic work. He has written extensively in last two decades. His 1983 book, titled The Intimate Enemy: Loss and Recovery of Self Under Colonialism, talked about the psychological problems posed at a personal level by colonialism, for both coloniser and colonised. Nandy argues that the understanding of self is intertwined with those of race, class, and religion under colonialism, and that the Gandhian movement can be understood in part as an attempt to transcend a strong tendency of educated Indians to articulate political striving for independence in European terms. Nandy's writings reflect his engagement with a wide range of topics, including political disputes, racial conflicts, and non-violence.

== Works ==
Books
Year	Title	Publisher
1978	The New Vaisyas : Entrepreneurial Opportunity and Response in an Indian City	Durham, NC: Carolina Academic
1980	At the Edge of Psychology: Essays in Politics and Culture	Oxford University Press
1980	Alternative Sciences: Creativity and Authenticity in Two Indian Scientists	Oxford University Press
1983	The Intimate Enemy: Loss and Recovery of Self Under Colonialism	Oxford University Press
1983	Science, Hegemony and Violence: A Requiem for Modernity	Oxford University Press
1987	Traditions, Tyranny, and Utopias: Essays in the Politics of Awareness	Oxford University Press
1989	The Tao of Cricket: On Games of Destiny and the Destiny of Games	Oxford University Press
1993	Barbaric Others: A Manifesto on Western Racism	Pluto Press
1994	The Illegitimacy of Nationalism: Rabindranath Tagore and the Politics of Self	Oxford University Press
1994	The Blinded Eye: Five Hundred Years of Christopher Columbus	Other India Press
1995	The Savage Freud and Other Essays on Possible and Retrievable Selves	Oxford University Press
1995	Creating a Nationality: the Ramjanmabhumi Movement and Fear of the Self	Oxford University Press
1996	The Multiverse of Democracy: Essays in Honour of Rajni Kothari	Sage Publication
1999	The Secret Politics of Our Desires: Innocence, Culpability and Indian Popular Cinema	--
2002	Time Warps – The Insistent Politics of Silent and Evasive Pasts.	--
2006	Talking India: Ashis Nandy in conversation with Ramin Jahanbegloo	Oxford University Press
2007	TIME TREKS: The Uncertain Future of Old and New Despotisms	Permanent Black
2007	A Very Popular Exile	Oxford University Press
2013	"Dissenting Knowledges, Open Futures":the multiple selves & strange destinations of Ashis Nandy by Vinay Lal, second edition	Oxford University Press

Selected articles

- Nandy, Ashis (1984). "Culture, State and the Redisovery of Indian Politics". Economic and Political Weekly. 19 (49): 2078–2083. JSTOR 4373849.
- Nandy, Ashis (1995). "An Anti-secularist Manifesto". India International Centre Quarterly. 22 (1): 35–64. JSTOR 23003710.
- Nandy, Ashis (1997). "The Twilight of certitudes: Secularism, Hindu Nationalism, and Other Masks of Deculturation". Alternatives: Global, Local, Political. 22 (2): 157–176. doi:10.1177/030437549702200201. JSTOR 40644885. S2CID 145675018.
- Nandy, Ashis (12 August 2006). "Nationalism, Genuine and Spurious: Mourning Two Early Post-Nationalist Strains". Economic and Political Weekly. 41 (32): 3500–3504. JSTOR 4418563.

Selected essays

- Unclaimed Baggage, The Little Magazine
- 1982 – The Psychology of Colonialism: Sex, Age, and Ideology in British India. Psychiatry 45 (Aug. 1982): 197–218.
- 1983 – Towards an Alternative Politics of Psychology. International Social Science Journal 35.2 (1983): 323–38.
- 1989 – The Fate of the Ideology of the State in India. The Challenge in South Asia: Development, Democracy and Regional Cooperation. Eds. Poona Wignaraja and Akmal Hussain. Thousand Oaks: Sage, 1989.
- 1989 – The Political Culture of the Indian State. Daedalus 118.4 (Fall 1989): 1–26.
- 1990 – Satyajit Ray's Secret Guide. East-West Film Journal 4.2 (June 1990): 14–37.
- 1991 – Hinduism Versus Hindutva: The Inevitability Of A Confrontation
- 1993 – Futures Studies: Pluralizing Human Destiny. Futures 25.4 (May 1993): 464–65.
- 1994 – Tagore and the Tiger of Nationalism. Times of India 4 September 1994.
- 1995 – History's Forgotten Doubles. History & Theory 34.2 (1995): 44–66.
- 1996 – Bearing Witness to the Future. Futures 28.6–7 (Aug. 1996): 636–39.
- 1999 – Indian Popular Cinema as a Slum's Eye View of Politics. The Secret Politics of Our Desires: Innocence, Culpability and Indian Popular Cinema. Zed: 1999. 1–18. (also editor)
- 2000 – Gandhi after Gandhi after Gandhi (May, 2000)
- 2002 – Obituary Of A Culture
- 2004 – A Billion Gandhis
- 2006 – Cuckoo over the cuckoo's nest Tehelka
- 2007 – What fuels Indian Nationalism? Tehelka
- 2009 – The Hour Of The Untamed Cosmopolitan Tehelka; Partition And The Fantasy Of A Masculine State The Times of India

== Awards ==
- Fukuoka Asian Culture Grand Prize in 2007
- Hans Kilian Prize by Kohler Foundation, Germany in 2019
- Ashis & Uma Nandy Annual Lecture, Univ of California, San Diego 2024

== Controversies ==
During the Jaipur Literature Festival held in January 2013, Nandy participated in a panel where he was quoted to have made controversial statements on corruption among "lower" castes in India. It was reported that he said:

It is a fact that most of the corrupt come from OBCs and Scheduled Castes and now increasingly the Scheduled Tribes. I will give an example. One of the states with the least amount of corruption is state of West Bengal when the CPI(M) was there. And I must draw attention to the fact that in the last 100 years, nobody from OBC, SC and ST has come anywhere near to power. It is an absolutely clean state.

Rajasthan Police lodged an FIR under the SC/ST Act against Ashis Nandy for his statement regarding corruption among the SC/ST and OBCs. After Nandy's lawyer moved the Supreme Court to quash all the allegations against him, the Court issued a stay order on his arrest on 1 February 2013. The subaltern scholar Dr. P. Satyanarayana of Vaagdevi College of Engineering in Warangal has challenged Nandy's remarks and expressed shock at the vociferous support he received for this from the Indian media and academia, asking rhetorically, "Is Prof. Nandy a holy cow?".

Some scholars interpreted Nandy's controversial remarks as satirical, while others strongly criticized them as offensive and casteist. Nandy's use of sarcasm has been noted in academic contexts, though opinions about his statement were divided. In fact, he found support from academic quarters. In 2016–17, Nandy received the KK Daomdaran Award from the Sree Narayana Mandira Samiti for his academic contributions, including work related to marginalised communities and castes.

== Views on Narendra Modi ==
In 2019, The New Yorker magazine reported:

"During the dispute over Babri Masjid, Ashis Nandy began a series of interviews with R.S.S. members. A trained psychologist, he wanted to study the mentality of the rising Hindu nationalists. One of those he met was Narendra Modi, who was then a little-known BJP functionary. Nandy interviewed Modi for several hours, and came away shaken. His subject, Nandy told [the reporter], exhibited all the traits of an authoritarian personality: puritanical rigidity, a constricted emotional life, fear of his own passions, and an enormous ego that protected a gnawing insecurity. During the interview, Modi elaborated a fantastical theory of how India was the target of a global conspiracy, in which every Muslim in the country was likely complicit. 'Modi was a fascist in every sense,' Nandy said. 'I don't mean this as a term of abuse. It's a diagnostic category.'"

== Interviews ==
- Ashis Nandy in conversation with Gurcharan Das
- Ashis Nandy in conversation with Vinay Lal

== See also ==
- Science and technology studies in India
