= Vaiatu, Lääne-Viru County =

Village in Estonia

Coordinates: 59°21′N 26°01′E

Vaiatu
- Village
- Interactive map of Vaiatu
- Country: Estonia
- County: Lääne-Viru County
- Parish: Kadrina Parish
- Time zone: UTC+2 (EET)
  - Summer (DST): UTC+3 (EEST)

Vaiatu is a village in Kadrina Parish, Lääne-Viru County, in northeastern Estonia.

== Notable people ==
- Aleksander Valsiner (1903–1972), educator, born in Sarapiku (now part of Vaiatu)
