= Jaan Valsiner =

Estonian-American developmental and cultural psychologist

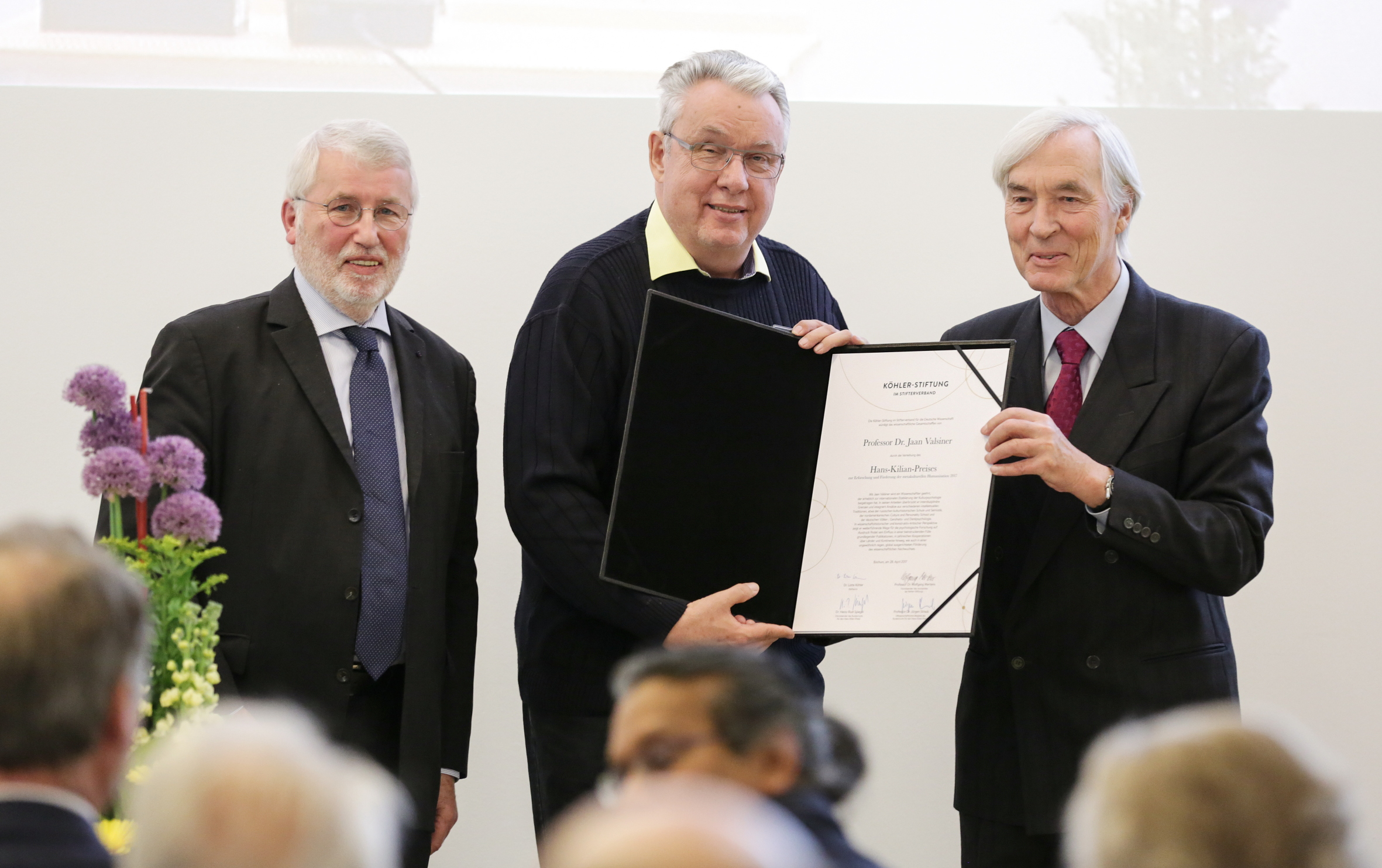
- Jaan Valsiner (in the middle) at the reception of Hans-Kilian-Award (2017)

Jaan Valsiner (born June 29, 1951, in Tallinn, Estonia) is an Estonian-American professor of developmental and cultural psychology, the recipient of Alexander von Humboldt Prize (1995) for his interdisciplinary work on human development and 2017 Hans-Kilian-Award winner, the Foreign Member of the Estonian Academy of Sciences and the former Niels Bohr Professor of Cultural Psychology (in 2013–2018), currently, a professor at Aalborg University, Denmark.

== Life ==
Jaan Valsiner is the son of the Estonian educator Aleksander Valsiner (1903–1972). Jaan Valsiner worked as a professor of psychology in Clark University in Worcester, Massachusetts from 1997. Between 2013 and 2018, Valsiner was a Niels Bohr Professor, since then a professor at Aalborg University in Denmark.

His early studies were in the field of developmental psychology, specifically in the analysis of mother-child interaction patterns and ever since he identifies himself as "cultural psychologist with a consistently developmental axiomatic base". His later studies and research focus gradually shifted into cultural psychology and cultural organization of human cognitive and affective processes throughout life-span. He has also considerably contributed to the fields of the history of psychology as well as methodology of psychological research. His other major research interest is the intersection of and interconnections between psychology and semiotics.

He has been a visiting professor in Brazil, Japan, Australia, Estonia. Germany, Italy, Luxembourg, United Kingdom, and the Netherlands. On February 22, 2008, he was announced an Honourable Doctor of the Tallinn University.

Jaan Valsiner is the editor-in-chief of Culture and Psychology (SAGE Publishing; as a founding editor in 1995 and until now), Integrative Psychological and Behavioral Science (Springer Publishing, from 2007), and of The Oxford Handbook of Culture and Psychology (Oxford University Press, 2012). He is also the editor of several book series, such as Advances in Cultural Psychology and Annals of Cultural Psychology' with Information Age Publishing (IAP), Charlotte, North Carolina, USA; History and Theory of Psychology with Transaction Publishers, USA (sold to Taylor & Francis in 2016 and merged with its Routledge imprint); Cultural Dynamics of Social Representation with Routledge in UK; and one of the founding editors of the IAP Yearbook of Idiographic Science (since 2008)

== Awards ==
- 1995 – Alexander von Humboldt Award for research in social sciences
- 1995–1997 – Senior Fulbright Lecturing Award in Brazil
- 2001 – 4th Class Order of the White Star
- 2008 – Honourable doctorate at the Tallinn University
- 2010 – Honourable doctorate at the University of Valle, Colombia
- 2017 – Hans-Kilian-Award
- 2017 – the Foreign Member of the Estonian Academy of Sciences

== Selected works ==
- 1987 – Culture and the development of children's action (2nd ed. in 1997). Chichester: Wiley.
- 1988 – Developmental Psychology in the Soviet Union. Bloomington: Indiana University Press.
- 1991 – Understanding Vygotsky. A quest for synthesis, with René van der Veer. Malden: Blackwell Publishing.
- 1994 – The Vygotsky Reader, with René van der Veer. Oxford, UK: Wiley-Blackwell.
- 1998 – The Guided Mind. Cambridge: Harvard University Press.
- 2000 – The social mind: Construction of the idea. With R. van der Veer. New York: Cambridge University Press.
- 2007 – The Cambridge Handbook of Socio-Cultural Psychology, with Alberto Rosa.
- 2007 – Culture in minds and societies. New Delhi: Sage.
- 2012 – A Guided Science: History of Psychology in the Mirror of Its Making. Transaction Publishers/Routledge.
- 2014 – Invitation to Cultural Psychology. London: Sage.
- 2017 – From Methodology to Methods in Human Psychology. Springer VS. SpringerBriefs in Psychology.
