= Nahida Ruth Lazarus =

German–Jewish author, essayist, scholar and literary critic

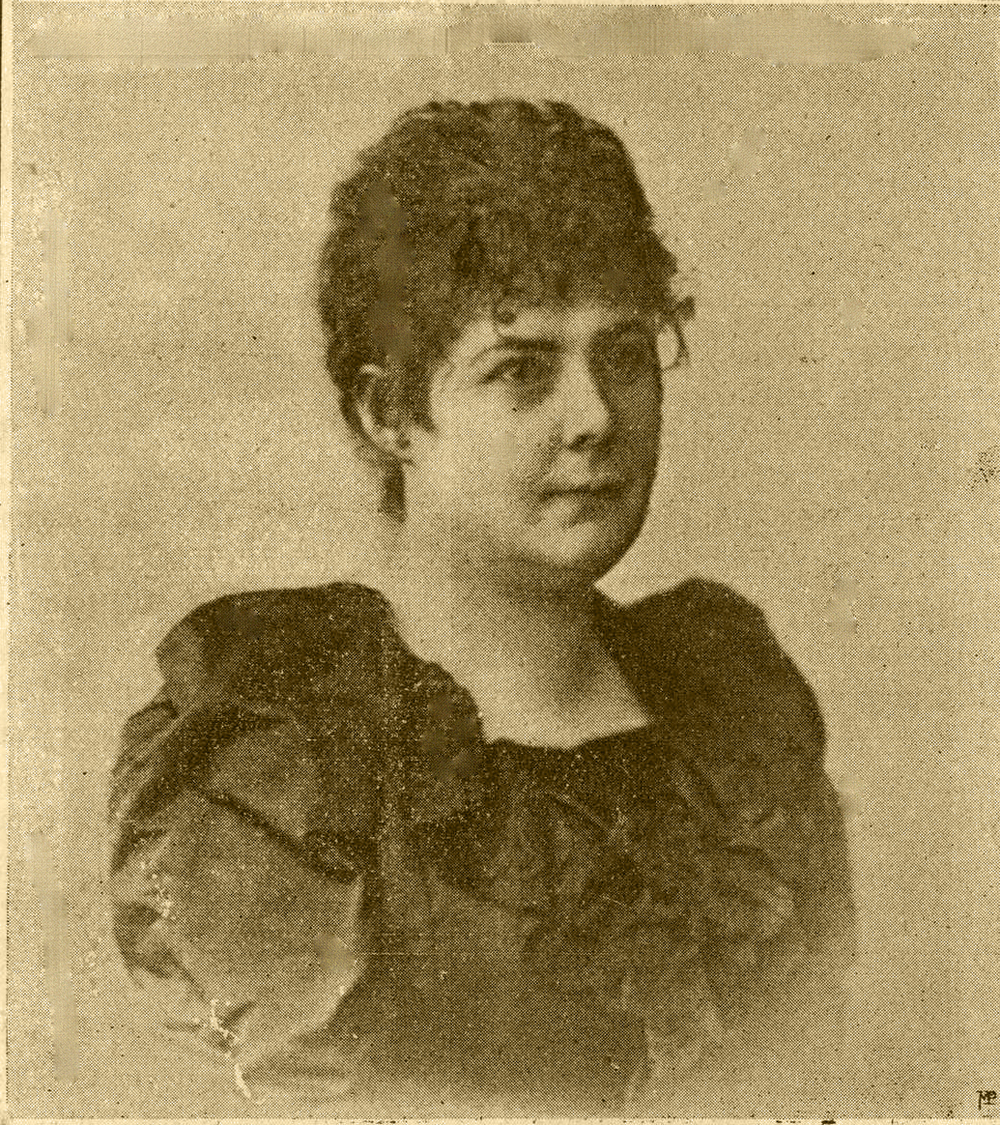
Nahida Ruth Lazarus, 1899

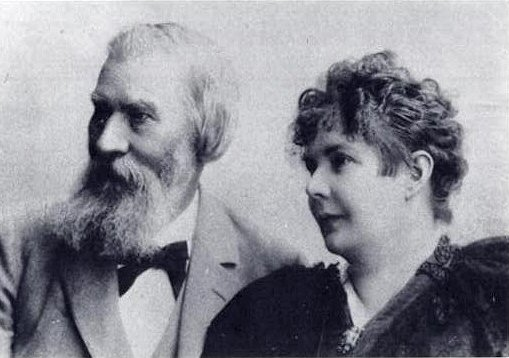
Moritz Lazarus and Nahida Ruth Lazarus.

Nahida Lazarus (February 3, 1849 – January 17, 1928) was a German–Jewish author, essayist, scholar, and literary critic. She was born in Berlin into a German Christian family. She was married first to Dr. Max Remy (in her writings she still signed herself Nahida Remy), after whose death she became a convert to Judaism and married the German philosopher Professor Moritz Lazarus in 1895.

Nahida Lazarus contributed many essays to the Vossische Zeitung, Monatszeitung, and Westermann's Monatshefte about history, art, sociology, and theatrical criticism. She was the author of several dramas, including Die Rechnung ohne Wirth (1870), Wo die Orangen blühen (1872), Constanze 1879, Die Grafen Eckardstein (1880), Schicksalswege (1880), Domenico, Nationale Gegensätze (1884), Sicilianische Novellen (1885), and Liebeszauber, (1887). She wrote the essays "Geheime Gewalten" in 1890, "Das Jüdische Weib" in 1892, "Das Gebet in Bibel und Talmud" in 1892, "Kulturstudien über das Judentum," in 1893, "Humanität im Judentum," in 1894. She wrote "Ich suchte Dich," an autobiography, in 1898. After the death of her husband, she prepared a volume of his "Lebenserinnerungen".

== Sources ==
- LAZARUS, NAHIDA RUTH on the Jewish Encyclopedia
