= Hans-Kilian-Award =

The Hans Kilian Award honored researchers whose outstanding scientific achievements provide a deeper insight into the historical and cultural existence of humankind and the changing human psyche. The award, a cash prize of 80,000 euros, was one of the best-endowed social sciences awards in Europe. It was awarded every two years between 2011 and 2019, five times in total.

The award was conceived by Lotte Köhler and established by the Köhler Foundation. It bears the name of the late social psychologist and psychoanalyst Hans Kilian (1921-2008) and aimed to foster his idea of an interdisciplinary social psychology and psychoanalysis as well as his concept of “metacultural humanization.” This concept reflects the interactions between individual life history and broader sociohistorical developments and aims to integrate social and cultural psychological, psychoanalytic, anthropological, historical, and sociological perspectives.

In line with Hans Kilian's ideas, the award recognized international scientific achievements that cross the boundaries between disciplines and cultures and create productive syntheses between previously isolated areas of knowledge. Acknowledged were inter- and transdisciplinary perspectives that combine theories, methods, and findings from a wide spectrum of disciplines including the humanities, the social sciences, and cultural studies, as well as psychiatry and other areas of medicine.

The work of the prize committee and the jury, the prize ceremony and the associated prizewinner’s colloquium were coordinated by the Hans Kilian and Lotte Köhler Center (KKC) for Social and Cultural Scientific Psychology and Historical Anthropology which was founded by the Köhler Foundation in August 2014 and whose office and activities are based at the Chair of Social Theory and Social Psychology, Ruhr University Bochum, Germany.

== Awardees ==
- 2011: Professor Dr. Hartmut Böhme
- 2013: Professor Dr. Hans Joas
- 2015: Professor Dr. Jessica Benjamin
- 2017: Professor Dr. Jaan Valsiner
- 2019: Professor Dr. Ashis Nandy
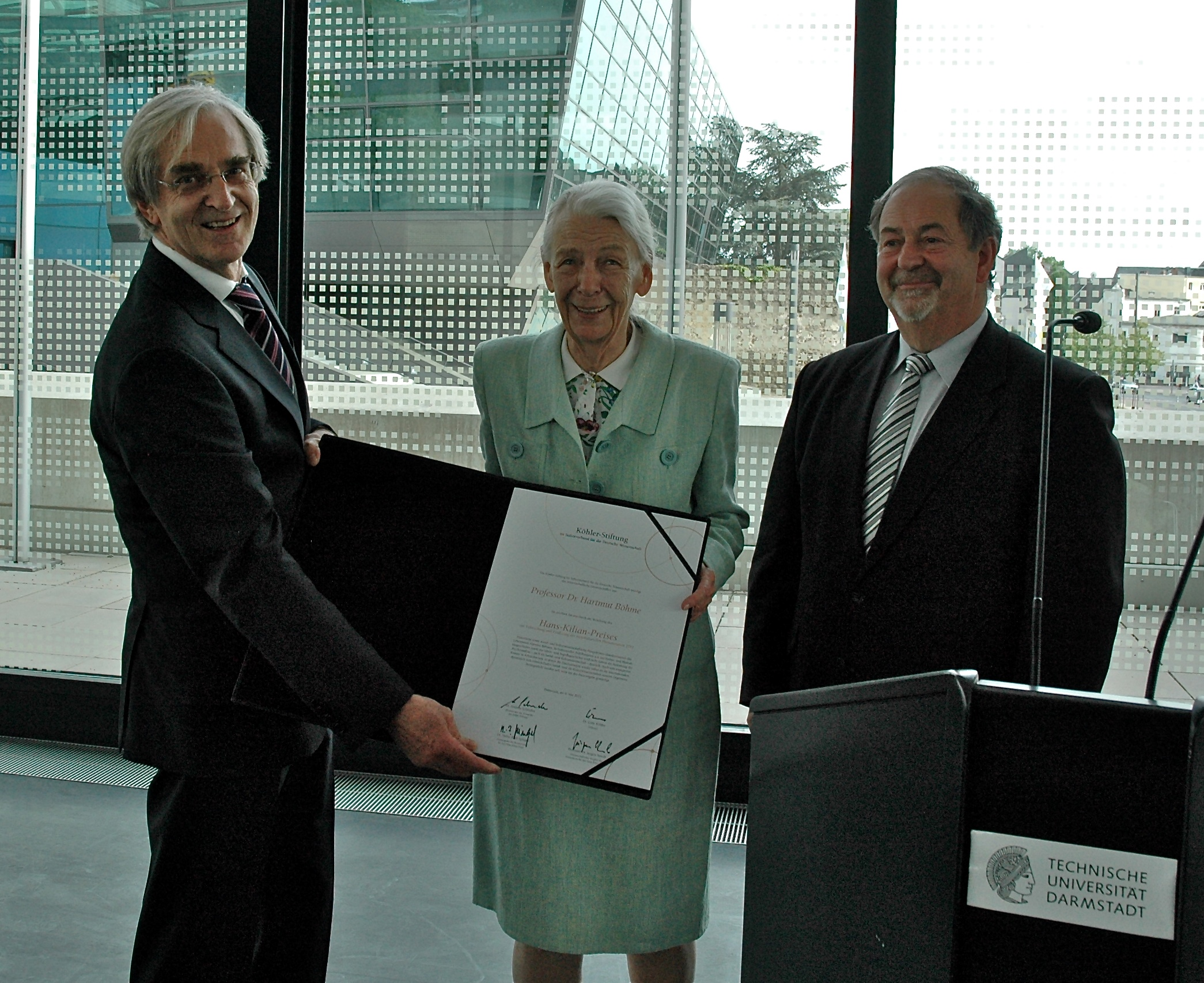
2011: Hartmut Böhme, Lotte Köhler, Ambros Schindler

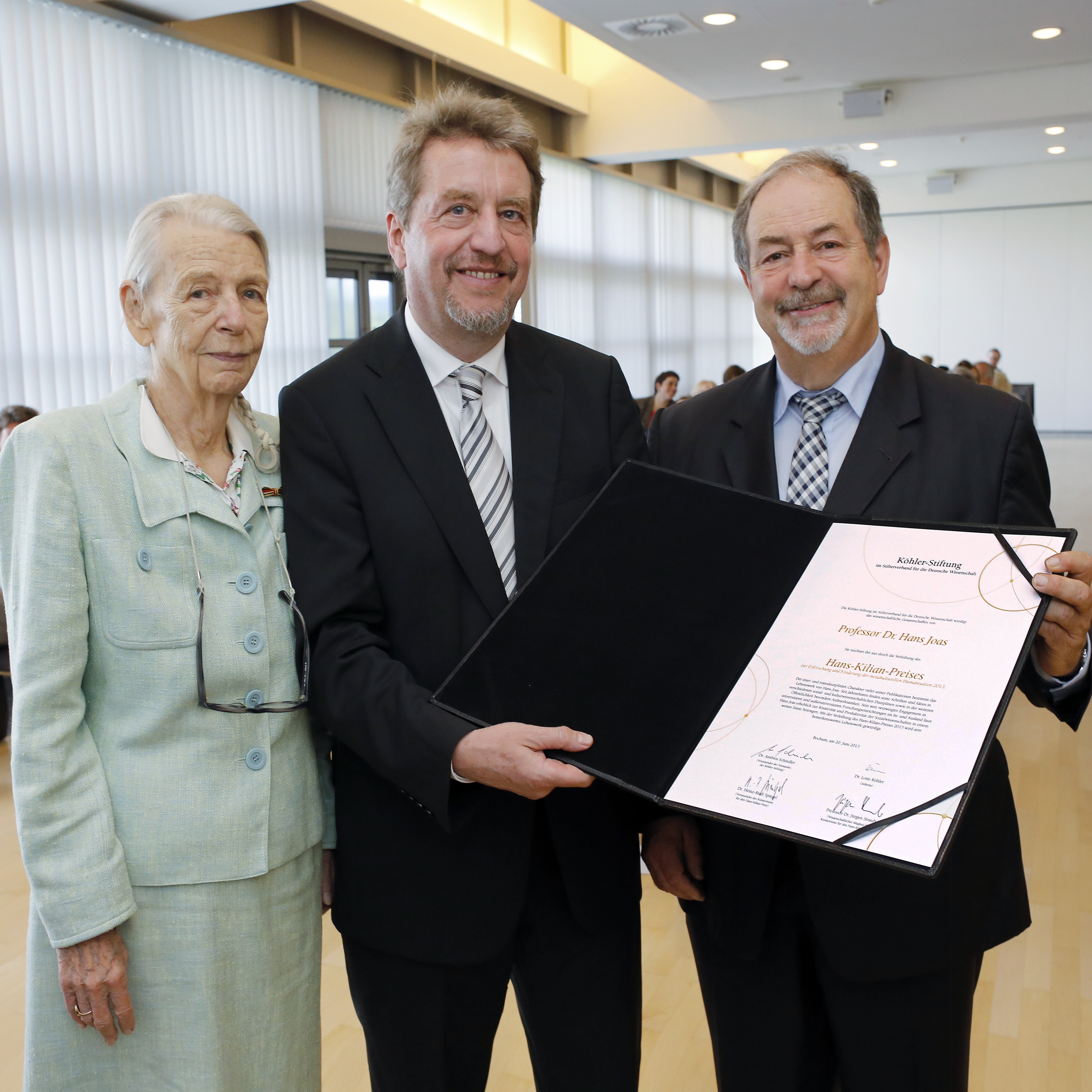
2013: Lotte Köhler, Hans Joas, Ambros Schindler

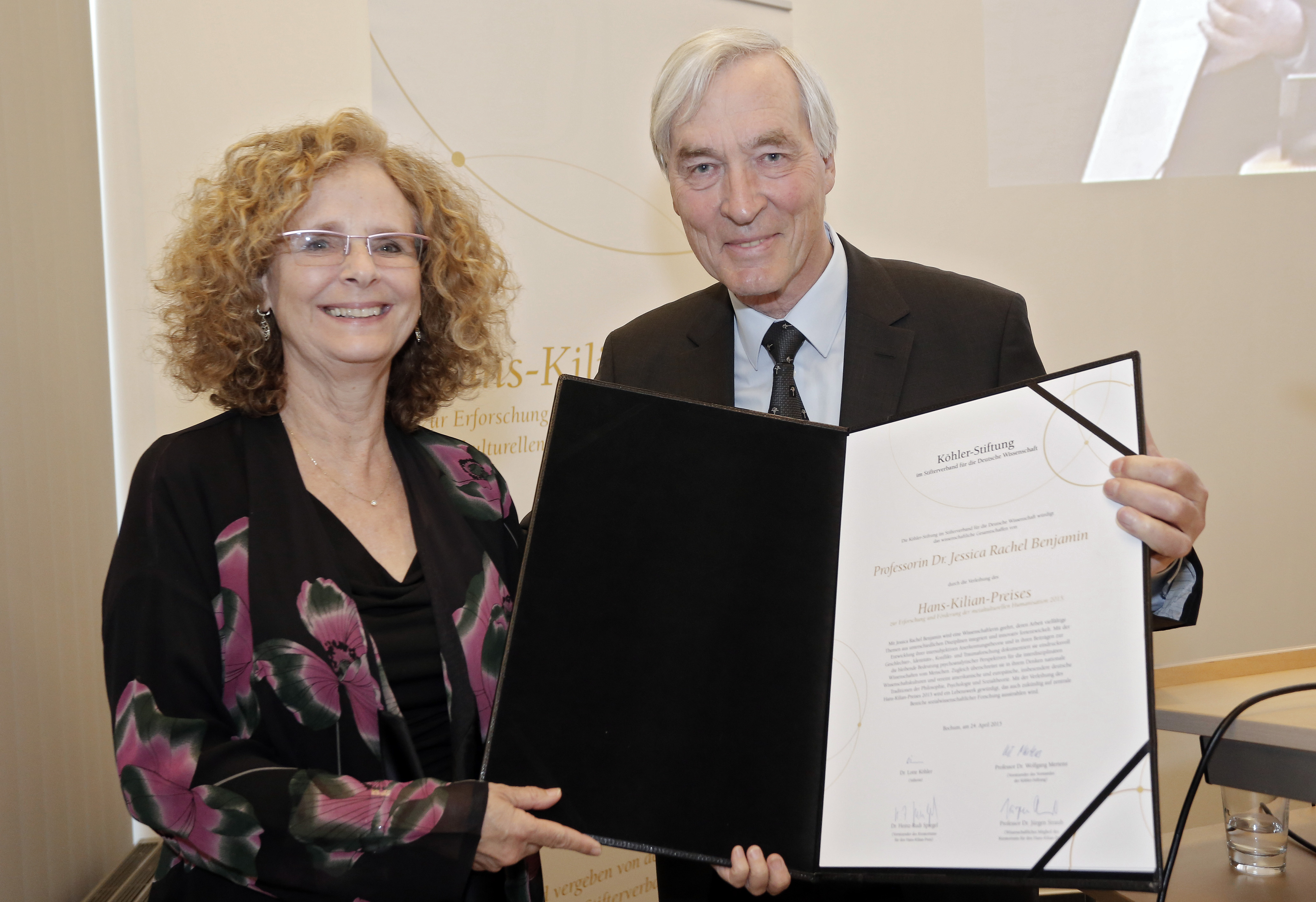
2015: Jessica R. Benjamin, Wolfgang Mertens

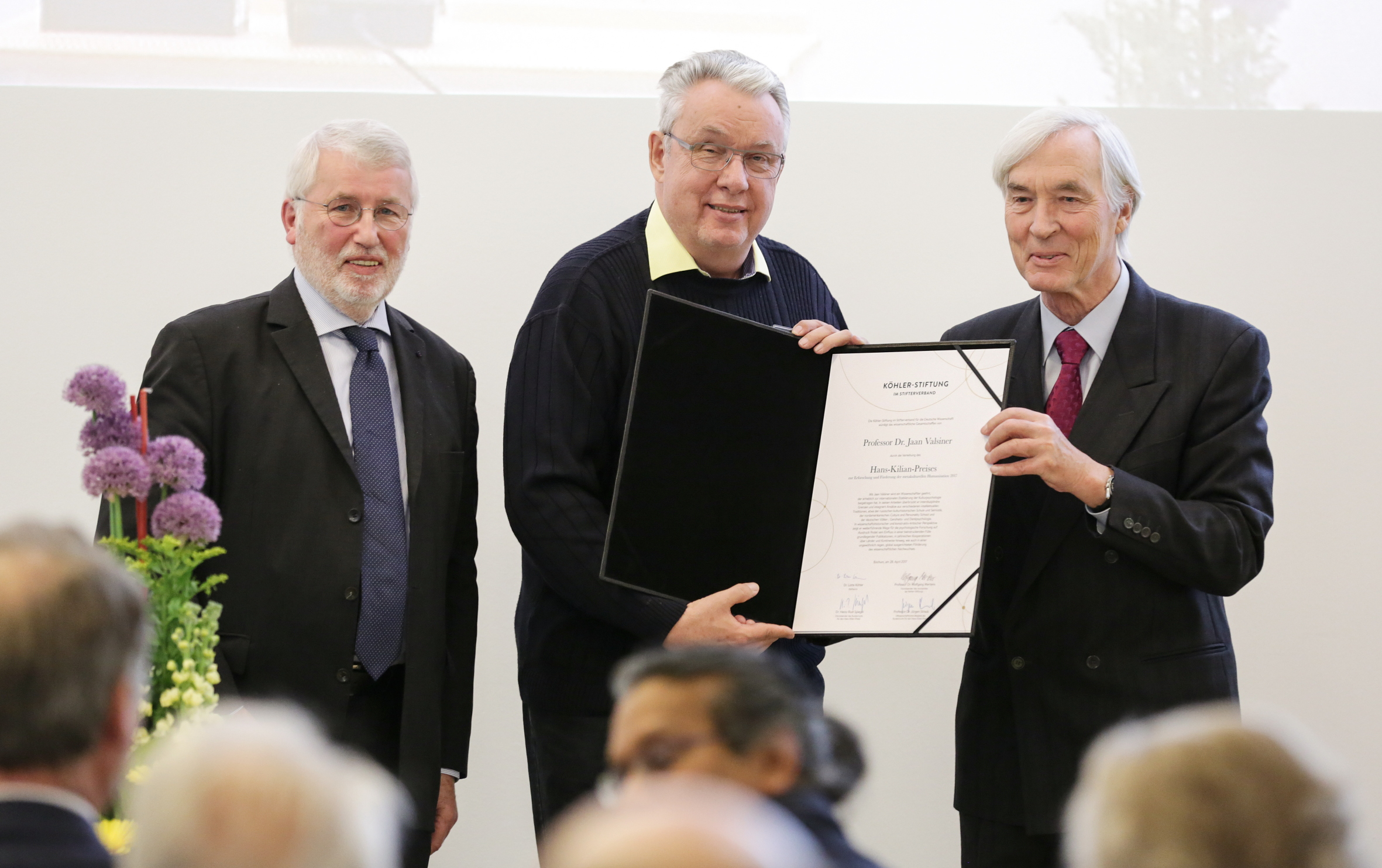
2017: Heinz-Rudi Spiegel, Jaan Valsiner, Wolfgang Mertens

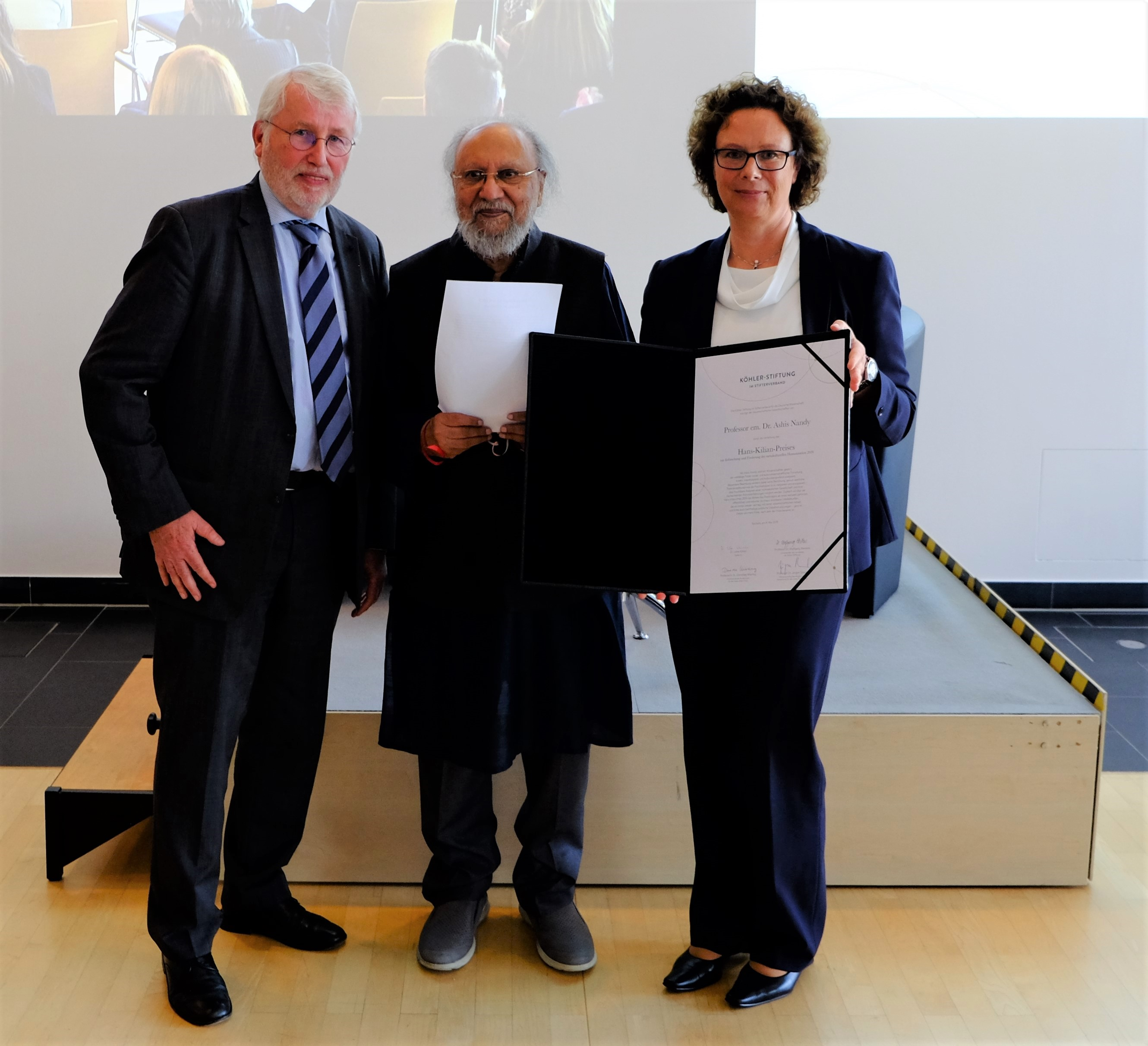
2019: Heinz-Rudi Spiegel, Ashis Nandy, Andrea Locker

== See also ==
- List of social sciences awards
