= Moritz Lazarus =

German-Jewish philosopher and psychologist

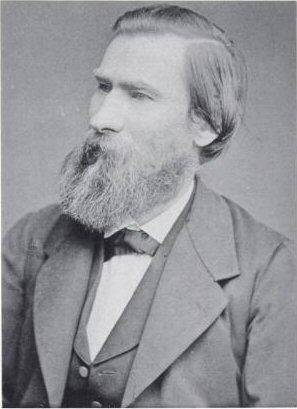
- Moritz Lazarus
- Born: 15 September 1824; Filehne, Posen
- Died: 13 April 1903 (aged 78); Meran, Tyrol
- Spouse: Sarah Lebenheim (m. 1850)
- Scientific career
- Fields: Psychology

Moritz Lazarus (15 September 1824 – 13 April 1903), born at Filehne, in the Grand Duchy of Posen, was a German-Jewish philosopher, psychologist, and a vocal opponent of the antisemitism of his time.

== Life and education ==
He was born at Filehne, Posen. The son of Aaron Levin Lazarus, a pupil of Akiba Eiger, and himself president of the bet din and the yeshiva of Filehne (died there in 1874), he was educated in Hebrew literature and history, and subsequently in law and philosophy at the University of Berlin. In 1850 he obtained his PhD degree; in the same year he married Sarah Lebenheim.

From 1860 to 1866 he was professor in the University of Berne, and subsequently returned to Berlin as professor of philosophy in the Kriegsakademie (1868) and later in the University of Berlin (1873). On the occasion of his seventieth birthday he was honored with the title of Geheimrath. He died in Meran.

== Philosophy ==
The fundamental principle of his philosophy was that truth must be sought not in metaphysical or a priori abstractions but in psychological investigation, and further that this investigation cannot confine itself successfully to the individual consciousness, but must be devoted primarily to society as a whole. The psychologist must study mankind from the historical or comparative standpoint, analysing the elements which constitute the fabric of society, with its customs, its conventions and the main tendencies of its evolution.

This Völkerpsychologie (folk or comparative psychology) is one of the chief developments of the Herbartian theory of philosophy; it is a protest not only against the so-called scientific standpoint of natural philosophers, but also against the individualism of the positivists.

In support of his theory he founded, in combination with Heymann Steinthal, the Zeitschrift für Völkerpsychologie und Sprachwissenschaft (1859). His own contributions to this periodical were numerous and important. His chief work was Das Leben der Seele (Berlin, 1855–1857; 3rd ed., 1883). Other philosophical works were: Ueber den Ursprung der Sitten (1860 and 1867), Ueber die Ideen in der Geschichte (1865 and 1872); Zur Lehre von den Sinnestäuschungen (1867); Ideale Fragen (1875 and 1885), Erziehung und Geschichte (1881); Unser Standpunkt (1881); Ueber die Reize des Spiels (1883).

Apart from the great interest of his philosophical work, Lazarus was pre-eminent among the Jews of the so-called Semitic denomination in Germany. Like Heine, Auerbach and Steinthal, he rose superior to the narrower ideals of the German Jews, and took a leading place in German literature and thought. He protested against the violent antisemitism of the time, and, in spite of the moderate tone of his publications, drew upon himself unqualified censure. He wrote in this connection a number of articles collected in 1887 under the title Treu und Frei: Reden und Vorträge über Juden und Judenthum. In 1869 and 1871 he was president of the first and second Jewish synods at Leipzig and Augsburg.

== Founds "Völkerpsychologie" ==
Lazarus' first publication, "Die Sittliche Berechtigung Preussens in Deutschland" (Berlin, 1850), appealed to the public at large. In this book he claimed for Prussia the leadership over the other German states on account of her political, philosophical, and religious superiority. From 1850 Lazarus devoted himself especially to psychology. Applying the laws of the psychology of the individual to the nation and to mankind (for these he considered as social beings), Lazarus established a new branch of research which he termed "Völkerpsychologie" (national psychology). In an article entitled "Ueber den Begriff und die Möglichkeit einer Völkerpsychologie als Wissenschaft" (in Robert Prutz's "Deutsches Museum," 1851) he laid the foundation for the study of this science. Nine years later, in collaboration with Steinthal, his friend and brother-in-law, Lazarus established the "Zeitschrift für Völkerpsychologie und Sprachwissenschaft" (vols. i-xx, Berlin, 1860–90; continued as the "Zeitschrift des Vereins für Volkskunde"). From 1856 to 1858 he published his principal work, "Das Leben der Seele in Monographien" (3 vols.; 3d ed., 1883–97). It deals with the principal problems of psychology from the standpoint of the philosophy of Herbart. Written in a popular and easy style, it soon found a large circle of readers.

In 1860 Lazarus was called to the University of Bern as professor of psychology; six years later he returned to Berlin and was appointed teacher of philosophy at the Royal Military Academy (1867); and in 1874 he became professor of philosophy at the university of that city. He was one of the founders of the Schillerstiftung and for many years its president; he was also curator of the Victoria Lyceum. On the occasion of his seventieth birthday Lazarus was honored by the German emperor, the University of Bern, and the Hebrew Union College of Cincinnati. The first conferred upon him the title of "Königlicher Geheimer Regierungsrath"; the second, the degree of doctor of law; and the third, that of doctor of theology. In 1895 Lazarus, after the death of his first wife, married the widow Nahida Ruth Remy, who was raised a Protestant but under his influence had embraced Judaism. During his last years Lazarus lived a retired life in Meran.

Among his shorter philosophical and historical writings may be mentioned: "Ueber den Ursprung der Sitten," 1860; "Ueber die Ideen in der Geschichte," 1861; "Zur Lehre von den Sinneserscheinungen," 1867; "Ein Psychologischer Blick in Unsere Zeit," 1872; "Ideale Fragen," 1878; "Erziehung und Geschichte," 1881; and "Ueber die Reize des Spiels," 1883.

== Communal activity ==
Lazarus took an active part in the public and spiritual life of the Prussian Jews. From 1867 to 1892 he was a member of the Repräsentanten-Versammlung of the Jewish congregation of Berlin; from 1882 to 1894, vice-president of the Deutsch-Israelitischer Gemeindebund; from 1867 to 1874, president of the Berlin branch of the Alliance Israélite Universelle; in 1869, president of the Jewish Synod of Leipzig, and in 1871 of that of Augsburg. He was also vice-president of the Russian Auxiliary Committee and of the Romanian Committee (1869–94). Lazarus was furthermore one of the founders of the Lehranstalt für die Wissenschaft des Judenthums of Berlin, and for many years president of its board of curators. He was a very effective and popular public speaker. His most important lectures on Jews and Judaism were collected and published in his "Treu und Frei," Leipzig, 1887 (containing his speeches at the meetings of the two synods; "Was Heiss National?"; "Unser Standpunkt"; "An die Deutschen Juden"; "Auf Moses Mendelssohn"; "Auf Michael Sachs"; "Aus einer Jüdischen Gemeinde vor Fünfzig Jahren").

Lazarus devoted much time and energy to combating that antisemitism which took its rise in Germany about 1878. He was one of the most prominent Jewish apologists of his time. Like many of his contemporaries, he believed (erroneously) that antisemitism was merely a passing fancy, a phenomenon engendered by reactionary times, which could be explained away in writings or addresses. He maintained that the Jews were united only by means of their religious history ("Treu und Frei," p. 77). In this case as in many others, when considering Jewish matters, Lazarus follows the dictates of his desires rather than the interests of the commonweal ("Gemeingeist"). Much cited for apologetic purposes is his definition of the concept "nation," as the essential and only objective characteristic of which he takes not the similarity of customs and morals, of territory, religion, and race, but the bond of language.

== "Die Ethik des Judenthums" ==
Of his more important contributions to Jewish literature may be cited: "Der Prophet Jeremias" (1894), a lecture, and "Die Ethik des Judenthums"(part i, 1898; 2d ed., 1899; translated into English by Henrietta Szold, and published by the Jewish Publication Society of America, 1900). In the latter work Lazarus takes ethics as the resultant rather than as the basic principle of religion, and, following Kant, establishes as the principle of Jewish ethics in particular the co-equality of God and the law of autonomy, whereby the Jewish conception of God has, of course, been given up. Lazarus fails to show the historical development of the morals of Judaism according to the various sources, as has been pointed out by Herman Cohen ("Das Problem der Jüdischen Sittenlehre, eine Kritik von Lazarus, 'Ethik des Judenthums,'" in "Monatsschrift," xliii, 385 et seq.).

== See also ==
- Leopold Zunz
- Hermann Cohen
- Heymann Steinthal
- Wilhelm Wundt
