= Historical psychology =

Historical psychology is an emerging discipline that examines how human psychology and history continuously co-evolve, exploring how psychology changes over time and how contemporary psychological differences across cultures have emerged through historical processes. Historical texts and artifacts function as psychological data from "dead minds" to investigate how historical and institutional shifts (such as changes in kinship, religion, and technology) shaped the diverse social, political, and cognitive landscapes we see today around the globe.

== Methods in Historical Psychology ==
=== Historical Text Analysis ===
Natural language processing (NLP) has become an important tool in historical psychology by enabling researchers to analyze large collections of historical corpora for evidence of psychological change over time. NLP enables scholars to examine language across long periods of time, revealing long-term changes in concepts such as individualism, morality, emotions, and social stereotypes. Techniques including diachronic word embedding analysis, dynamic topic modeling, and contextual language representations make it possible to quantify psychological constructs from historical writings. NLP methods have expanded the scale and precision of research on how human thought and culture change over time. Recently, some have argued that Historical Large Language Models (HLLMs) trained on historical corpora could be an informative tool for social and behavioral sciences. These models have the potential to strengthen collaboration across social sciences, history, and cultural evolution by transforming qualitative historical documents into quantitative data that complement conventional historical methods. At the same time, important limitations persist. Surviving historical records are often small in scale and reflect elite perspectives rather than the experiences of the general population. Moreover, the outputs of HLLMs require careful benchmarking against independent historical, ethnographic, and expert evidence to ensure that reconstructed psychological and cultural patterns accurately reflect past societies.

There is at least one functioning HLLM: talkie-1930-13b is a 13-billion-parameter language model released in April 2026. Described by its creators as a "vintage" language model, it was trained on approximately 260 billion tokens of English-language material published before 1931, including books, periodicals, patents, and court records. The date restriction was intended to keep the model's training knowledge within the pre-1931 corpus and to provide a low-contamination testbed for AI research. The model performs less efficiently than contemporary models trained with comparable computational resources, largely because historical documents contain substantial transcription and optical character recognition errors. To adapt the model for dialogue without introducing modern conversational conventions, the developers created a post-training pipeline based on structured historical sources, including nineteenth-century etiquette manuals, combined with preference optimization evaluated by modern language models.

=== Agent-Based Modeling ===
Agent-based modeling (ABM) is increasingly viewed as a valuable method for both historical psychology and cultural evolution because it allows researchers to simulate how individual decisions and social interactions produce large-scale historical patterns. In historical psychology, ABMs can test hypotheses about how beliefs, emotions, norms, or cognitive biases spread through populations under different ecological or institutional conditions, offering a way to evaluate explanations that cannot be experimentally manipulated. In cultural evolution, ABMs model processes such as social learning, innovation, conformity, prestige bias, and migration to explore how cultural traits emerge, persist, or disappear over historical time.

=== Multiwave Surveys ===
Repeated, multiwave surveys such as the World Values Survey offer historical psychology a way to track how the psychological profile of societies changes over time. By asking comparable questions across decades and countries, they reveal shifts in values, beliefs, trust, identity, morality, and attitudes toward authority—changes that can then be linked to events such as economic crises, democratization, migration, war, or technological change. These surveys capture people living through history. Researchers can compare generations, periods, and societies to test whether psychological differences reflect enduring cultural legacies or responses to changing conditions. Although survey waves cannot by themselves establish causality, especially when samples and question wording vary, they provide rare, systematic evidence that psychology is not fixed. Thus, multiwave surveys function as a temporal record of human thought over decades, making them a natural method for studying how minds and histories develop together.
