= Heymann Steinthal =

German philologist and philosopher (1823–1899)

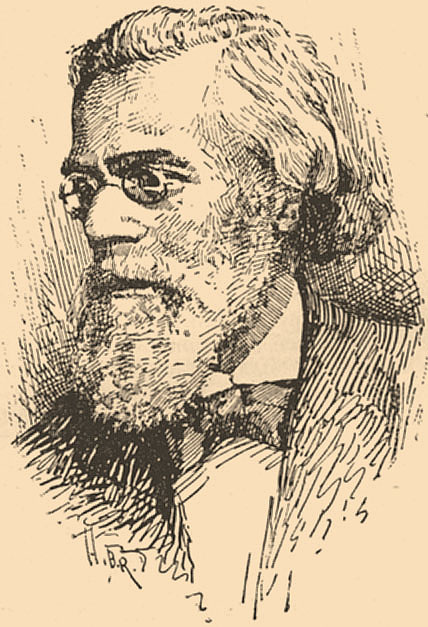
- Heymann Steinthal
- Born: 16 May 1823; Gröbzig, Anhalt-Köthen, Germany
- Died: 14 March 1899 (aged 75); Berlin, Prussia, Germany

Heymann, Hermann or Chajim Steinthal (16 May 1823 – 14 March 1899) was a German philologist and philosopher.

He studied philology and philosophy at the University of Berlin, and was in 1850 appointed Privatdozent of philology and mythology at that institution. He was influenced by Wilhelm von Humboldt, whose Sprachwissenschaftliche Werke he edited in 1884. From 1852 to 1855 Steinthal resided in Paris, where he devoted himself to the study of Chinese, and in 1863 he was appointed assistant professor at the Berlin University; from 1872 he was also privat-dozent in critical history of the Old Testament and in religious philosophy at the Hochschule für die Wissenschaft des Judenthums. In 1860 he founded, together with his brother-in-law Moritz Lazarus, the Zeitschrift für Völkerpsychologie und Sprachwissenschaft, in which was established the new science of comparative ('folk') psychology, the Völkerpsychologie. Steinthal was one of the directors (from 1883) of the Deutsch-Israelitischer Gemeindebund, and had charge of the department of religious instruction in various small congregations.

On the occasion of the 100th anniversary of Chajim H. Steinthal's death, an international, interdisciplinary conference, organized by the Leopold-Zunz-Zentrum zur Erforschung des europäischen Judentums (LEUCOREA Stiftung, Wittenberg), the Synagogue Museum Gröbzig and the Konrad Adenauer Foundation, was held December 1–4, 1999, at Schloss Wendgräben (Saxony-Anhalt, Germany). The conference volume was published by Brill and contains papers presented in the fields of linguistics, philosophy, Jewish studies and history as well as an inventory of Steinthal’s papers in the Jewish National and University Library in Jerusalem.

== Works ==
Steinthal's principal works are:

- Die Sprachwissenschaft W. von Humboldts und die Hegel'sche Philosophie (Berlin, 1848)
- Klassifikation der Sprachen, dargestellt als die Entwickelung der Sprachidee (ib. 1850), which appeared in 1860 under the title Charakteristik der Hauptsächlichre, edited and enlarged by the author and Misteli, as the second volume of the Abriss der Sprachwissenschaft (ib. 1893)
- Der Ursprung der Sprache im Zusammenhang mit den letzten Fragen alles Wissens (ib. 1851, 4th enlarged ed. 1888)
- Die Entwickelung der Schrift (ib. 1852)
- Grammatik, Logik, Psychologie: Ihre Prinzipien und ihre Verhältniss zu einander (ib. 1855)
- Geschichte der Sprachwissenschaft bei den Griechen und Römern (ib. 1863, 2d ed. 1889-91)
- Philologie, Geschichte und Psychologie in ihren gegenseitigen Beziehungen (ib. 1864)
- Die Mande-Negersprachen, psychologisch und phonetisch Betrachtet (ib. 1867)
- Abriss der Sprachwissenschaft (vol. I: Einleitung in die Psychologie und Sprachwissenschaft, ib. 1871; 2d ed. 1881)
- Allgemeine Ethik (ib. 1885)
- Zu Bibel und Religionsphilosophie (ib. 1890; new series, 1895), consisting mainly of lectures delivered before the Gesellschaft der Freunde for the benefit of the Lehranstalt für die Wissenschaft des Judenthums.

The first volume of his Gesammelte Kleine Schriften appeared at Berlin in 1880.
