= World spirit =

Concept in German philosophy

The world spirit (German: Weltgeist) is a concept in German philosophy. It posits that the whole of reality is the process of a rational and intelligible process: the world spirit. It is most closely associated with the tradition of German idealism, particularly the philosophy of Georg Wilhelm Friedrich Hegel, and has been extensively reinterpreted by later thinkers.

== Definition ==
The concept of the world spirit as a metaphysical principle is primarily known as a central concept in Hegel's speculative philosophy: for him, the entire historical reality, the totality, is the process of the world spirit. Through this, the “ultimate goal” in world history is realized, namely “reason in history.” With this view, he followed from the world spirit theory first published by Schelling.

== Example ==
He saw Napoleon, for example, as the epitome of this. Hegel saw Napoleon as the “world soul on horseback,” (German: Weltseele zu Pferde) a phrase that was later often changed to “world spirit on horseback.”

== Later interpretations ==
Marx and Engels made rather cryptic references to Hegel's definition of the world spirit. In The German Ideology, they use the term in a materialistic and critical way: the chicanery of the world spirit or the “cunning of reason” ultimately reveals itself to be the global market. The early socialist Moses Hess, who was associated with them, on the other hand, advocated a kind of messianism, arguing that the French Revolution had ushered in a new world era.

== Literature ==
- Oliver W. Lembcke: Über das Ende der Geschichte und den Beginn moderner Politik. Zu Hegels Figur des Weltgeistes. In: Kristian Kühl, Gerhard Seher (Hrsg.): Rom, Recht, Religion. Symposion für Udo Ebert zum siebzigsten Geburtstag. (= Politika. Bd. 5). Mohr Siebeck, Tübingen 2011, ISBN 978-3-16-150894-3, S. 297–307.
- Miklós Vassányi: Anima mundi. The Rise of the World Soul Theory in Modern German Philosophy. (= Archives internationales d’histoire des idées. Bd. 202). Springer, Dordrecht u. a. 2011, ISBN 978-90-481-8795-9, teilweise zugleich Dissertation, Universität Löwen, 2007.
