= Aleksander Valsiner =

Estonian educator (1903–1972)

- Born: February 18, 1903; Sarapiku, Governorate of Estonia, Russian Empire
- Died: October 5, 1972 (aged 69); Tallinn, then part of Estonian SSR, Soviet Union
- Occupation: Educator

Aleksander Valsiner (February 18, 1903 – October 5, 1972) was an Estonian educator.

== Early life and education ==
Valsiner was born in Sarapiku (now part of the village of Vaiatu in the Governorate of Estonia, Russian Empire), the son of Kustav Valsiner (1873–1946) and Elisabeth Valsiner (née Jürgens, 1869–?). He graduated from Tapa High School in 1922 and studied at the Faculty of Philosophy of the University of Tartu from 1922 to 1924 and then at the Faculty of Mathematics and Natural Sciences from 1924 to 1929. He was a member of the Raimla Student Association (ÜS Raimla) for a short time (1926–1929).

== Career ==
Valsiner worked as a teacher at Kõnnu Primary School in Saaremaa (1929–1931), Saaremaa General High School, and Kuressaare Maritime School. From 1938 to 1940, he was a teacher at Tallinn Teacher Training College. From 1940 to 1950, he worked as the deputy minister of education of the Estonian SSR, from 1950 to 1959 as the director of the Estonian SSR Teacher Training Institute, and from 1959 to 1965 as the director of the Estonian SSR Pedagogy Research Institute.

From 1949 to 1950, Valsiner studied at the Higher Party School at the CPSU Central Committee in Moscow.

== Family ==
Valsiner married Silja (Vassilissa) Liisi Ennemuist (1914–1958), with whom he had a son, the Estonian American psychologist Jaan Valsiner.

== Awards ==
- 1945: Honored Teacher of the Estonian SSR
