= Ethnocultural empathy =

Ethnocultural empathy refers to the understanding of feelings of individuals that are ethnically and/or culturally different from oneself. This concept casts doubts on global empathy, which assumes that empathy is "feeling in oneself the feelings of others" regardless of the other's characteristics (e.g. age, gender, and ethnicity) or context. Ethnocultural empathy, on the other hand, assumes that empathy toward others probably increases if the other is similar to oneself in terms of ethnicity, gender, age, or cultural background.

== Concept history ==
Traditionally, empathy is roughly defined as an intellectual ability to take the role or perspective of another person and/or an emotional response to another person that takes the form of the same emotional display. Empathy is a relatively stable and consistent personal trait within a certain time period. However, people usually hold different levels of empathy toward different individuals based on perceived psychological similarity. Two primary factors influencing perceived psychological similarity are ethnics and culture. People usually feel more empathetic towards individuals who are in the same ethnic/cultural groups as they are than those who are not.

Quintana defined ethnic perspective taking as a cognitive-developmental ability that an individual could attain as they proceed through developmental life stages. Five stages of ethnic perspective-taking ability include (1) physicalistic and observable perspective, (2) literal perspective, (3) non-literal and social perspective, (4) group perspective and (5) multicultural perspective of ethnicity. First, children establish their ethnic identity by distinguishing themselves from other ethnic groups based on physical features. Once children understand the physical differences with other groups, they then can become aware of the perspectives, attitudes, and experiences of other ethnic groups, and finally can develop the ability to take the perspective of other ethnic groups.

Ridley and Lingle define cultural empathy as a "learned ability" composed of three subordinate processes: cognitive, affective, and communicative. Cognitive processes include cultural perspective-taking and cultural self–other differentiation. Affective processes include vicarious affect and the expressive concern. Communicative processes include probing for insight and conveying accurate understanding.

Based on the ethnic perspective of perception and culture difference of empathy, Wang and her colleagues proposed the concept of "ethnocultural empathy". Previous research had addressed similar or related constructs such as cultural empathy, empathetic multicultural awareness, ethnic perspective taking; these are usually used interchangeably with "ethnocultural empathy".

== Constructs and measurements ==
To date, the Scale of Ethnocultural Empathy (SEE) is the only formally published measurement of ethnocultural empathy. SEE is composed of three instrumental aspects: intellectual empathy, empathic emotions, and the communication of those two.

Intellectual empathy is the ability to understand a racially or ethnically different person's thinking and/or feeling. It is also the ability to perceive the world as the other person does; that is, racial or ethnic perspective taking.

The empathic emotions component of ethnocultural empathy is attention to the feeling of a person or persons from another ethnocultural group to the degree that one is able to feel the other's emotional condition from the point of view of that person's racial or ethnic culture. In addition, it refers to a person's emotional response to the emotional display of a person or persons from another ethnocultural group.

The communicative empathy component is the expression of ethnocultural empathic thoughts (intellectual empathy) and feelings (empathic emotions) toward members of racial and ethnic groups different from one's own. This component can be expressed through words or actions.

== Application ==
Ethnocultural empathy is usually applied in cross-culture and/or cross-ethnics analysis. Levels of ethnocultural empathy vary by demographic features and societal factors. Women are more likely to report higher levels of ethnocultural empathy than men, Non-White individuals were found to have significantly higher levels of general and specific ethnocultural empathy than their White counterparts. Racism was negatively associated with ethnocultural empathy.

People with different levels of ethnocultural empathy were also reported to respond distinctively to individuals who are similar with themselves and those who are not. For example, people with higher level of ethnocultural empathy work more successfully with individuals from other cultures.

Enthnocultural empathy not only functions in cross-cultural contexts, but also in situations such as majorities vs. minorities, males vs. females, natives vs. non-natives. High levels of enthocultural empathy are predictive of positive attitude towards minority groups, such as rape victims, domestic violence victims, female leaders, etc.

Enthnocultural cultural empathy has been used in research areas such as racialism, feminism, multiculturalism, ethnic identity, etc.

== See also ==
- Empathy
- Ethnicity
- Multiculturalism
- Sympathy
