= Hans Kilian and Lotte Köhler Center =

Research center at Ruhr University

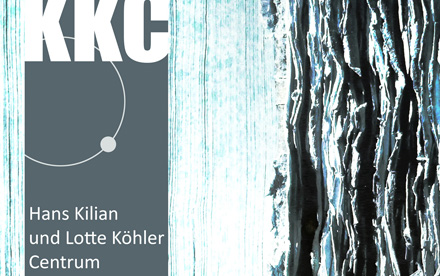
- Abbreviation: KKC
- Formation: 2014
- Purpose: Advancement of interdisciplinary psychological research
- Location: Bochum
- Directors: Pradeep Chakkarath and Jürgen Straub
- Website: http://www.kilian-koehler-centrum.de/

The Hans Kilian and Lotte Köhler Center for Cultural Psychology and Historical Anthropology (KKC) was established in August 2014 at the Chair for Social Theory and Social Psychology, Ruhr-University Bochum, Germany. It is mainly funded by the Köhler Foundation, which is a member of the Stifterverband, a German business community initiative advocating long-term improvement of the German education and research landscape. The KKC is named after two individuals whose biographies are closely linked, namely, Hans Kilian and Lotte Köhler.

Hans Kilian (1921–2008), M.D., held the Chair for Social Psychology and Applied Psychoanalysis at the University of Kassel, Germany, from 1971 to 1984. His research interests included psychosomatic medicine, work psychology, cultural-evolutionary anthropology, and the interdisciplinary analysis of psychohistorical and psychosocial developments in individuals and their social environments. One of his specific interests was the lasting psychological effect of the Nazi system on post-war Germany.

Lotte Köhler (*1925–2022), M.D., received her psychoanalytic training in Munich, Germany, and Zurich, Switzerland. As a scientist, she is known for her work on self psychology, early-childhood memory development, and attachment theory. As a businesswoman, she chaired the supervisory board and the shareholders’ meeting at Goebel, LLC, located in Darmstadt, Germany. She ended her business career in 1987 when she established the Köhler Foundation, which supports the advancement of the human sciences.

From the 1960s until Hans Kilian’s death, they shared a bond in both the private and scientific domain. As for the latter, they were decisive in introducing Heinz Kohut’s self psychology to Germany in the 1970s.

Following Hans Kilian’s and Lotte Köhler’s aim to advance psychological and psychoanalytical research through interdisciplinary efforts, the KKC invites input from scholars of manifold fields. In this regard, sociology, anthropology, history, education, and philosophy are considered as important as work in research fields like critical psychology, cultural and postcolonial studies, gender studies, and religious studies.

== Scientific Activities ==
The KKC resulted from a development that began when the Hans-Kilian-Award was given for the first time in 2011. Since then, its activities have increased and focus on the following areas:

- Hans-Kilian-Award
- Hans Kilian Lecture Series
- Hans Kilian symposia and workshops
- Hans Kilian fellowships
- Hans Kilian student program
- Collected Works of Hans Kilian
- Kilian-Köhler-Archive
