= German nouns =

Overview of how nouns are used in German

The nouns of the German language have several properties, some unique. As in many related Indo-European languages, German nouns possess a grammatical gender; the three genders are masculine, feminine, and neuter. Words for objects without obvious masculine or feminine characteristics like 'bridge' or 'rock' can be masculine, feminine, or neuter. German nouns are declined (change form) depending on their grammatical case (their function in a sentence) and whether they are singular or plural. German has four cases: nominative, accusative, dative and genitive.

German is unusual among languages using the Latin alphabet in that all nouns are always capitalized (for example, "the book" is always written as "das Buch"). Other High German languages, such as Luxembourgish, also capitalize both proper and common nouns. Only a handful of other languages capitalize their nouns, mainly regional languages with orthographic conventions inspired by German, such as Low German and Saterland Frisian. Under the influence of German, the Scandinavian languages formerly capitalized their nouns; Danish retained the practice until 1948.

Noun compounds are written together with no spacing (for example, the German word for "spy satellite" is "Spionagesatellit"). Plurals are normally formed by adding -e, -en, -er (or nothing) to the noun, and sometimes a vowel is also changed (the umlaut). Moreover, recent loanwords from French and English often keep the -s plural ending.

== Declension for case ==
N-noun:

A masculine or neuter noun with genitive singular and nominative plural ending in -(e)n is called an n-noun or weak noun (German: schwaches Substantiv). Sometimes these terms are extended to feminine nouns with genitive singular and nominative plural -en.

For the four cases, nominative, accusative, dative and genitive, the main forms of declension are:

=== For singular nouns ===
I: Feminine nouns usually have the same form in all four cases.
a) nom., acc. die Frau, dat., gen. der Frau

Exceptions are:

- Old declensions like Frau/Fraw with genitive and dative singular der Frauen/Frawen (in older usage)
- Words derived from Latin with nominative singular in -a and genitive singular -ae/-ä (in older usage)
- Proper nouns derived from Latin: Maria (“Mary” in English) with genitive singular Mariä, Mariens, Marias and (der) Maria.
- Proper nouns which have two genitive forms like Brunhilds Speer (“Brunhild's spear”) and der Speer der Brunhild (“the spear of Brunhild”).
- The words Mama, Mami, Mutter, Mutti, Oma, Omi which have forms like die Tasche der Mama, but also Mamas Tasche.

II: Personal names, all neuter and most masculine nouns have genitive case -(e)s endings: normally -es if one syllable long, -s if more. Traditionally the nouns in this group also add -e in the dative case, but this is now often ignored.
a) nom. der Mann, acc. den Mann, dat. dem Mann(e), gen. des Mann(e)s
b) nom. das Kind, acc. das Kind, dat. dem Kind(e), gen. des Kind(e)s.

III: Masculine n-nouns take -(e)n for genitive, dative and accusative: this is used for masculine nouns ending with -e denoting people and animals, masculine nouns ending with -and, -ant, -ent, -ist (mostly denoting people), and a few others (mostly animate nouns).
a) nom. der Drache, acc. den Drachen, dat. dem Drachen, gen. des Drachen
b) nom. der Prinz, acc. den Prinzen, dat. dem Prinzen, gen. des Prinzen.

IV: A few masculine nouns take -(e)n for accusative and dative, and -(e)ns for genitive.
a) nom. der Buchstabe, acc. den Buchstaben, dat. dem Buchstaben, gen. des Buchstabens
b) nom. der Glaube, acc. den Glauben, dat. dem Glauben, gen. des Glaubens.

=== For plural nouns ===
I: In the dative case, all nouns which do not already have an -n or -s ending add -n.
a) nom., acc. die Kinder, dat. den Kindern, gen. der Kinder
b) nom., acc. die Frauen, dat. den Frauen, gen. der Frauen.

=== General rules of declension ===
- Given the nominative singular, genitive singular, and nominative plural of a noun, it is possible to determine its declension.
- Note that for most feminine nouns, all singular forms are identical. This means that since n-nouns in general have all plural forms identical, all feminine n-nouns are effectively indeclinable.
- The dative plural of all nouns ends in -n if such an ending does not already exist, except that of nouns that form the plural with -s, which are usually loan words.
- Most nouns do not take declensions in the accusative or singular dative cases. A class of masculine nouns, called "weak nouns," takes the ending -n or -en in all cases except the nominative.

Dative forms with the ending -e, known in German as the Dativ-e (dem Gotte, dem Manne) are mostly restricted to formal usage, but widely limited to poetic style. Such forms are not commonly found in modern prose texts, except in fixed expressions (such as im Stande sein: "to be able") and for certain words (e.g. (dem) Hause, Wege or Tode) which are, however, quite numerous; in these cases, omitting the -e would be similarly unusual. This ending is also still used semi-productively in poetry and music, mostly for the purposes of meter and rhyme.

Nevertheless, in the genitive, the ending -es is used …

- necessarily if the word ends with a sibilant (des Hauses, des Stoßes, des Schusses)
- usually by monosyllabic words (des Gottes, des Mannes)
- commonly if it ends on the letter d

Only words of more syllables usually add a simple -s (des Königs).

In colloquial usage, moreover, singular inflection of weak masculine nouns may be limited to those ending in -e (der Name – dem Namen). Other nouns of this class are sometimes not inflected. Thus one might occasionally hear dem Spatz, dem Idiot instead of the more formal dem Spatzen, dem Idioten.

=== Declension classes ===
Number	Singular				Plural		Example
Class / Case	Nominative	Accusative	Dative	Genitive	Nominative, Accusative, Genitive	Dative	Example
Article (M, N, F)	der, das, die	den, das, die	dem, dem, der	des, des, der	die, der (genitive)	den	Example
-(e)s, -e	Berg	Berg	Berg(e)	Berg(e)s	Berge	Bergen	der Berg, des Berg(e)s, die Berge
-(e)s, -er	Bild	Bild	Bild(e)	Bild(e)s	Bilder	Bildern	das Bild, des Bild(e)s, die Bilder
-(e)s, -en	Staat	Staat	Staat(e)	Staat(e)s	Staaten	Staaten	der Staat, des Staat(e)s, die Staaten
-s, -	Fahrer	Fahrer	Fahrer	Fahrers	Fahrer	Fahrern	der Fahrer, des Fahrers, die Fahrer
-s, -̈	Apfel	Apfel	Apfel	Apfels	Äpfel	Äpfeln	der Apfel, des Apfels, die Äpfel
-s, -e	Lehrling	Lehrling	Lehrling	Lehrlings	Lehrlinge	Lehrlingen	der Lehrling, des Lehrlings, die Lehrlinge
-s, -s	Radio	Radio	Radio	Radios	Radios	Radios	das Radio, des Radios, die Radios
-ns, -n	Name	Namen	Namen	Namens	Namen	Namen	der Name, des Namens, die Namen
-en, -en	Student	Studenten	Studenten	Studenten	Studenten	Studenten	der Student, des Studenten, die Studenten
-, -̈	Mutter	Mutter	Mutter	Mutter	Mütter	Müttern	die Mutter, der Mutter, die Mütter
-, -̈e	Kraft	Kraft	Kraft	Kraft	Kräfte	Kräften	die Kraft, der Kraft, die Kräfte
-, -en	Meinung	Meinung	Meinung	Meinung	Meinungen	Meinungen	die Meinung, der Meinung, die Meinungen
-, -s	Kamera	Kamera	Kamera	Kamera	Kameras	Kameras	die Kamera, der Kamera, die Kameras

=== Irregular declensions ===
Herr "gentleman"
	Singular	Plural
Nominative	der Herr	die Herren
Accusative	den Herrn	die Herren
Dative	dem Herrn	den Herren
Genitive	des Herrn	der Herren

Herz "heart"
	Singular	Plural
Nominative	das Herz	die Herzen
Accusative	das Herz	die Herzen
Dative	dem Herzen*	den Herzen
Genitive	des Herzens	der Herzen

- * vernacularly: dem Herz

Many foreign nouns have irregular plurals, for example:

	Nominative singular	Genitive singular	Nominative plural	Meaning
-s, -en	das Thema	des Themas	die Themen	the theme
-s, PL	das Thema	des Themas	die Themata	the theme
-, -en	der Amerikanismus	des Amerikanismus	die Amerikanismen	the Americanism
-, PL	der Modus	des Modus	die Modi	the mode or mood

== Orthography ==
All German nouns are capitalized. Capitalization is not restricted to nouns. Other words are often capitalized when they are nominalized (for instance das Deutsche ‘the German language’, a nominalized adjective).

== Compounds ==
As in other Germanic languages, German nouns can be compound in effectively unlimited numbers, as in Rinderkennzeichnungs- und Rindfleischetikettierungsüberwachungsaufgabenübertragungsgesetz ('Cattle Marking and Beef Labelling Supervision Duties Delegation Law', the name of an actual law passed in Mecklenburg-Vorpommern in 1999), or Donaudampfschiffahrtsgesellschaft ('Danube Steamboat Shipping Company', 1829).

Unlike English compounds, German compound nouns are usually written together as a single word: 'spy satellite' is thus Spionagesatellit and 'mad cow disease' Rinderwahn. Compound nouns take the gender of the last component noun (the head). In special cases, German compounds are hyphenated, as in US-Botschaft ("US embassy") or 100-prozentig ("100 percent"). The English-speaking humorist and essayist Mark Twain noted, of the difficulty of reading German compounds as opposed to English compounds, which are more often hyphenated: "these long things are hardly legitimate words, but are rather combinations of words, and the inventor of them ought to have been killed. They are compound words with the hyphens left out."

In addition, there is the grammatical feature of the Fugen-"s": certain compounds introduce an "s" between the noun stems, historically marking the genitive case of the first noun (cf. iḍāfah), but it occurs frequently after nouns which do not take an "s" in their genitive cases.

In many instances, the compound is acceptable both with and without the "s", but there are many cases where the "s" is mandatory and this cannot be deduced from grammatical rules, e.g. Hochzeitskleid = "wedding dress", Liebeslied = "love song", Abfahrtszeit = "time of departure", Arbeitsamt = "employment agency".

Occurrence of the Fugen-"s" seems to be correlated to certain suffixes (of the first stem); compounds with words in -tum, -ling, -ion, -tät, -heit, -keit, -schaft, -sicht, -ung and nominalized infinitives in -en mostly do take the "s", while feminine words not ending in -ion, -tät, -heit, -keit, -schaft, -sicht, -ung mostly do not, but there are exceptions. Use of the "s" is mostly optional in compounds in which the second element is a participle.

To reduce length or to highlight distinctions, a first or final part of a compound is sometimes mentioned only once but applies to more than one compound noun. For example:

- Bildergalerien und -ausstellungen ("picture galleries and [picture] exhibitions")
- Nähe Haupt- und Busbahnhof ("near the main railway [station] and bus station")

== Issues with number ==
As in English, some nouns (e.g. mass nouns) only have a singular form (singularia tantum); other nouns only have a plural form (pluralia tantum):

- Das All, der Durst, der Sand ("the Universe", "thirst", "sand")
- Die Kosten, die Ferien ("costs", "the holidays")

Traps abound in both directions here: common mass nouns in English are not mass nouns in German, and vice versa:

- information – Informationen, die Information ("the piece of information"), die Informationen ("the pieces of information")
- the police are (pl.) = die Polizei ist (sg.)

Again as in English, some words change their meaning when changing their number:

- Geld ("money") – Gelder ("different sources of money")
- Wein ("wine") – die Weine ("different types of wine")

A few words have two different plurals with distinct meanings. For example:

- Wort ("word") – Wörter (isolated words, as in "five words") - Worte (connected, meaningful words, as in "his last words")
- Bau – Bauten ("buildings") – Baue ("burrows")

Some words share the singular and can only be distinguished by their gender and sometimes their plural (compare “bases” in English, which can be the plural of two distinct words, “base” and “basis”):

- Gehalt – das Gehalt, die Gehälter ("salary") – der Gehalt, die Gehalte ("content")
- Band – das Band, die Bänder ("ribbon") – der Band, die Bände ("volume (of a book)")
- Teil – das Teil, die Teile (physical "piece" e.g. from a machine) – der Teil, die Teile (conceptual "part" e.g. from a speech)
- See – der See, die Seen ("lake") – die See ("sea", no plural form) – die See, die Seen (nautical term for "(large) wave")
- Kiefer – der Kiefer, die Kiefer ("jawbone") – die Kiefer, die Kiefern ("pine tree")

== See also ==
- German grammar
- German verbs
- German orthography
- Standard German phonology
