= Deutsch-Israelitischer Gemeindebund =

German Jewish organization (1869–1933)

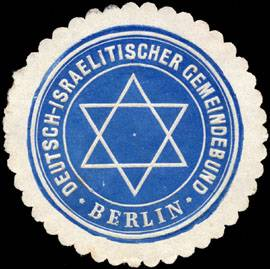
- Founded: 1869; 157 years ago
- Dissolved: 1933
- Type: Nonprofit
- Headquarters: Leipzig, Germany

The Deutsch-Israelitischer Gemeindebund (DIGB) was an umbrella organization for German Jews during the late 1800s and early 1900s. The organization was secular and primarily composed of Reform groups, with few Orthodox Jews participating. Founded in Leipzig in 1869 as the first Jewish umbrella group, the organization was dissolved by the Nazis in 1933. The DIGB was a forerunner of the Central Council of Jews in Germany, which has served as the main Jewish umbrella group in Germany since 1950.

== History ==
The DIGB was founded in Leipzig on July 3, 1869 in the North German Confederation.

In 1885, the DIGB published a statistical book of the Jewish population, due to the rapidly increasing rate of Jewish immigration to Germany in the 1880s.

== See also ==
- Central Council of Jews in Germany
- Union of Progressive Jews in Germany
