= Völkerpsychologie =

Type of psychology

Völkerpsychologie is a method of psychology that was founded in the nineteenth century by the famous psychologist Wilhelm Wundt. However, the term was first coined by post-Hegelian social philosophers Heymann Steinthal and Moritz Lazarus.

Wundt is widely known for his work with experimental psychology. Up until this time in history, psychology was almost exclusively using psychological experiments as a source of gathering information. Wundt believed that the very structure of psychological experiments leaves them severely lacking in their ability to investigate internal mental processes, such as consciousness and language. In an effort to build a method of psychological study which would allow for investigation of these processes, Wundt argued that science needed a deeper means of accessing the inner minds of its subjects. He cultivated a new branch of psychology known as Völkerpsychologie, which was distinct in its use of historical and comparative methods, rather than simply laboratory experimentation.

As Wundt believed that experiments can only access the outcomes of processes rather than the processes themselves, he argued that deeply ingrained mental processes should instead be accessed via other methods which can study the process itself. Wundt argued that Völkerpsychologie was particularly useful for the study of mental processes such as language - something which Wundt found particularly tricky. He believed that language was distinct among the collective human processes and, since it seemed to be crucial to the entire upper mental functions, those functions were concluded as exempt to experimental research.

Völkerpsychologie comes from the German culture. To this day, there is no clear English word that is similar to it. The derivative Volk, a German word, refers to “people, nation, tribe, or race”. Wundt simply wanted to create a new way to complete research without the use of experiments. This led him to discovering a new type of psychology which dealt with the communal and cultural products of human nature, which includes religions, languages, and mythologies.

== Creation of Völkerpsychologie ==
Wundt was very interested in the human nature of language. He wanted to know how apperception and thinking were related to language. Völkerpsychologie was a great way to study and research this, which is what he did. Before Wundt, there were many other theorists that associated thought with language. Many argued that silent thinking was a form of talking with oneself. Wundt did not agree with this idea. He came up with several situations in which a person's thoughts do not fully do justice to what they are actually thinking. When having conversations, people may tend to say "That's not what I had meant to say" or may wonder why they said something, when they realize that they are saying something which might not accurately depict what they are thinking internally. People will do this all the time, and this was a topic that Wundt used Völkerpsychologie to study. When someone disagrees with a statement that someone has made in conversation, we may find ourselves interrupting with a "What? Wait a minute, you are incorrect!" long before we can describe the actual point of disagreement. We tend to say things before our mind understands exactly why we say them. These examples are the exact reasons that Wundt used to promote his new branch of psychology, and why he thought that words and thoughts are different things.

To further explain his ideas on the new branch of psychology, Wundt wrote a book in which he titled Völkerpsychologie. This piece of work is ten volumes in total and went into much detail of the subject from Wundt's perspective. At one point in the document, he makes the comparison of Völkerpsychologie and experimental psychology to psychology and physiology. Each is an alternative perspective to one another, and each complements one another in various ways. Neither is dispensable, in Wundt's eyes. It is also noted that Wundt knew that Völkerpsychologie was essential for the completion of psychology in his earlier writings, but he did not fully commit to the explanation of it until his older age. He also went on to discuss how experimental psychology focused on the physical (outer) body experiences, but did not do a very good job at explaining the psychic (inner) phenomena that would take place as well. This is another reason he went on to create Völkerpsychologie.

Völkerpsychologie follows in the tradition of Lazarus and Steinthal by keeping the notion that specific social types of cognition, emotion, and behavior are based in social groups, sometimes known as communities. Wundt based his differentiation between social/folk psychology and individual psychology on the difference between social psychological states and processes of the individual. Because of this dependence on the community, in particular the social community, this whole area of psychological investigation is designated "social psychology" and distinguished from individual, or as it may be called because of its predominating method, experimental psychology."

Wundt became interested in Völkerpsychologie very early in his career. He became so interested in the topic that he offered a course on social psychology at Heidelberg University in 1859. In his first book, Beiträge zur Theorie der Sinneswahrnehmung (Natural History of Man), which he wrote when he was at Heidelberg, Wundt talked about the programs involving experimental psychology and Völkerpsychologie. In the second volume, Vorlesungen über die Menschen-und Thierseele (Lectures on the Human and Animal Mind), which Wundt wrote 16 years prior to when he started the experimental psychology program at Leipzig. He devoted many pages to the explanation and development of Völkerpsychologie. This shows his growing interest in and seriousness for implementing this form of psychology into mainstream psychology. The immediate topics in Völkerpsychologie are language, myth, and custom. For Wundt, the whole reason for the comparative and historical study of these mental topics was to provide an objective point of view for making inferences about the psychological processes involved when they are produced. However, Wundt was not interested in studying these topics just because they are interesting topics, as other professionals might. An example of this: "The origin and development of these products depend in every case on general psychical conditions which may be inferred from their objective attributes. Psychological analysis can, consequently, explain the psychical processes operative in their formation and development." Wundt naturally thought that experimental methods were wrong for the study of whole languages, myths, and customs, because they cannot be used properly in a scientific manner by introspection itself. Although the "supraindividual" (which means above or beyond the individual in groups) nature of whole languages, myths, and customs comes before their experimental investigation.

== Key contributors to Völkerpsychologie ==
Humboldt: The origin of Völkerpsychologie can be traced back to Wilhelm Humboldt, a nineteenth-century Prussian philosopher whose ideas and theories have influenced the likes of Moritz Lazarus, H. Steinthal, and Wilhelm Wundt. Humboldt, along with his younger brother, Alexander Humboldt, “shared an ideal of a broad humanity, an important underlying theme of his Völkerpsychologie.”

Lazarus and Steinthal: Scholars Moritz Lazarus and H. Steinthal coined the term “Völkerpsychologie,” which translates in English as “ethnic psychology.” In addition to founding Völkerpsychologie, Lazarus and Steinthal are credited with heavily influencing Wilhelm Wundt and his subsequent contributions to the scientific approach of Völkerpsychologie. Though they are recognized as being the founders of Völkerpsychologie, both men attribute many of their notions as being influenced by the ideas of brothers Wilhelm and Alexander Humboldt. Lazarus and Steinthal established an approach to Völkerpsychologie that focused on “establishing, reconstructing, and describing the common roots of human development in various nations.” Both Lazarus and Steinthal are of Jewish origin, which might explain why Völkerpsychologie came under criticism by several anti-Semitic conservatives once Völkerpsychologie began receiving significant recognition.

Wundt: While not being credited for founding Völkerpsychologie, Wilhelm Wundt is generally considered to be the face of the field. Wundt, a prominent German experimental psychologist, adapted many of the ideas of Lazarus and Steinthal and shaped them into what Völkerpsychologie has become known as in current times. Wundt hoped to establish a theory through his work that would provide insight into how cultures come to be, beginning with the early processes of their development and ending with the differentiation that exists between various types of cultures. Working on the ideas of Lazarus and Steinthal, Wundt also redefined Völkerpsycholgie’s scope as pertaining to language, mythology (arts, myths, and religion), and the moral system (law and culture). Though his work and ideas as an experimental psychologist have often been criticized as being too constricted, Wundt’s approach to Völkerpsychologie is perceived as having a much broader basis. Additionally, much of Wundt’s work as a psychologist is comprised in Völkerpsychologie.

Chamberlain: Houston Stewart Chamberlain was a conservative English author whose criticism of Völkerpsychologie led to development and changes within Völkerpsychologie itself. Amongst his criticisms, Chamberlain asserted that Völkerpsychologie had become a “mess” of a field, and that much of Völkerpsychologie’s shortcomings can be placed on its proponents, including Lazarus, Steinthal, and Wundt. As a result, Volkerpsychologie’s approach became twofold: a conceptual, theoretical approach, and an applied approach. Under Wundt and his predecessors, Völkerpsychologie was known for using a theoretical approach. Over time, however, an applied approach, or “differentielle Völkerpsychologie”, emerged. Differentielle Völkerpsychologie has been commonly used as an instrument for political goals, particularly in post-World War I Germany. Ernst Bergmann, a German philosopher and supporter of the Nazi party, believed that the German government should start utilizing Völkerpsychologie as a legitimate scientific field of study, stating that Germany’s “lack of psychological knowledge of other races” may again prove to be a major variable in deciding whether a war will be won or lost. Because of its connection with post-World War I Germany, Völkerpsychologie and its use have been repeatedly linked with the Nazi party.

== Current-day Völkerpsychologie ==
Völkerpsychologie, or roughly translated "folk psychology" (not to be confused with the English term folk psychology or common sense psychology), has a very mixed view in the world in the present day. The author of The Mind of the Nation, Egbert Klautke, admitted to having a stereotypical view of Völkerpsychologie. He stated that when he first started researching for his book he had the general view of Völkerpsychologie as an attempt to present national stereotypes as academic research and he was suspicious of its nationalist agenda and racist undertones. He also considered it mainly a German viewpoint. After completing his book his view changed. He had a much more sympathetic view of the attempts that Lazarus, Steinthal, and Wundt made. Even though it had flaws and shortcomings, Völkerpsychologie was a serious and honorable attempt to introduce a social science in the university setting. In doing this, they helped influence people in pioneering the social sciences all around the world. Another important thing that leads to the decline of Völkerpsychologie was the Nazis. The general weaknesses of "folk psychology" helped its decline, but mainly it was the idea that Völkerpsychologie was a part of the Nazi thinking. By the 1960s, the term itself had become a taboo work in the social sciences.

German anthropologist Andreas Vonderach released his book Völkerpsychologie. Was uns unterscheidet in 2014, covering the classic research and modern-day approaches like global marketing and genetics.
