= Sulzbacher Torah =

Torah scroll from 1792 or 1793

The Sulzbacher Torah is a Torah Scroll from the Synagogue of Sulzbach. It dates from 1792 or 1793 and survived both the Sulzbach town fire of 1822 and the November pogroms. After the fall of National Socialism, it was kept unrecognised in the Torah shrine of the Synagogue of Amberg for over seven decades. After its rediscovery, it was restored and completed on 27 January 2021, following the Day of Remembrance of the Victims of National Socialism ceremony of the German Bundestag in the Devotional Room of the Reichstag Building. Patrons were the representatives of the five permanent constitutional bodies of the Germany.

== History ==
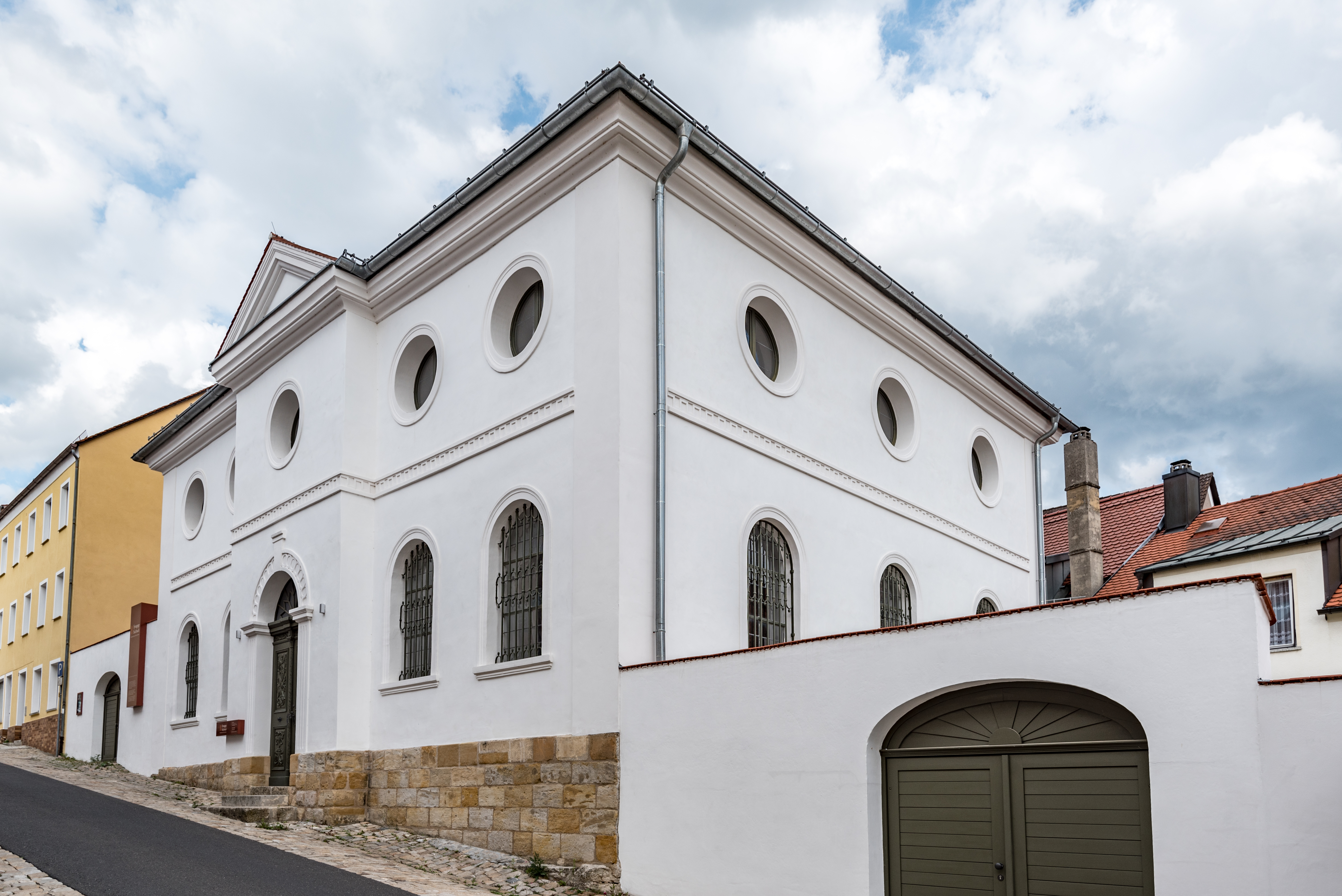
The Synagogue of Sulzbach today

The Torah scroll was written on parchment for the Synagogue of Sulzbach. Thirty animal skins were joined together for this purpose, resulting in a length of 24 meters and a height of 65 centimeters. Sulzbach had a flourishing Jewish community life from the middle of the 18th to the middle of the 19th century. Until 1851, one of the world's most important Hebrew book printings. In 1737, the Jewish community built a new synagogue to replace the dilapidated first synagogue of 1687, which burned down on the night of June 9–10, 1822. The rabbi of the time, Isak Aronsohn Mannheimer, was still able to save six Torah scrolls from the synagogue, among them probably the Sulzbach Torah scroll. Thanks to generous financial support from the congregation's own members and collections in other congregations, the new synagogue, built in the classicist style was consecrated on August 31, 1824. At the time, it was considered one of the most beautiful synagogues in Bavaria and was the center of Jewish life in Sulzbach. Nevertheless, the number of worshippers continued to decline and in September 1930 there was no minyan left. The synagogue was sold to the city of Sulzbach for a symbolic price and converted into a local museum. Thus, the building survived the November pogroms unscathed. The Torah scrolls and other liturgical objects were moved to the Synagogue of Amberg. It was assumed that it had been burned there with the synagogue's interior furnishings by SA men on Pogrom Night. In fact, Rabbi Leopold Godlewsky of Amberg was able to bring the Torah to safety in the local history museum of the city of Amberg before the night of the pogrom, where it survived the National Socialism. For the next seven decades it remained unrecognised in the Torah shrine of the Amberg synagogue.

== Rediscovery ==
In 2015, Elias Dray, the Rabbi of the Jewish community in Amberg, discovered the Sulzbach Torah scroll in the Torah shrine of the Amberg Synagogue, which he recognised as a historically valuable manuscript only because of the year. The Torah scroll bears the inscription "Sulzbach" and on its fixture the year "5553" according to the Jewish calendar, which corresponds to the end of the year 1792 and beginning of the year 1793 in the gregorian calendar. Such an indication of the year is decidedly rare. Since the Torah was worn out from long use and decades of storage, and the writing was badly faded, it was no longer considered kosher and could no longer be used ritually. Experts in Israel estimated the costs for a professional restoration of the Torah at 40,000 to 50,000 Euros. Therefore, the Amberg religious community initially refrained from restoration. Since it could no longer be used for ritual purposes, the Torah would normally have been kept in a Genizah or buried in a clay jar in a Jewish cemetery. Elias Dray, however, was hopeful that a way could be found to finance the restoration and thus use it in religious services. On 18 April 2016, the Torah was transferred to the Sulzbach synagogue as a lending gift for a year-long exhibition to mark the 350th anniversary of the community.

Later, the restoration was actually made possible by the German federal government covering the costs and was carried out in the Israeli town of Bnei Berak by a group led by Sofer Izak Rosengarten. In the process, the parchment was stabilised and each letter was traced by hand in ink. After the work, which took a year, was completed, the Torah was almost back in a condition that allowed it to be used in the service. Only eight letters at the end of the writing were still missing.

== Completion in the Deutscher Bundestag ==
The completion of the restoration is an act that is usually performed during a ceremony in a synagogue. In the case of the Sulzbacher Torah, it took place instead on 27 January 2021, the Day of Remembrance of the Victims of National Socialism, following the affiliated memorial hour of the German Bundestag in the Prayer Room in the Reichstag Building. There, Sofer Rabbi Shaul Nekrich (Kiryat Yearim, Israel) wrote the last eight letters on the end of the Torah scroll with a quill and kosher ink. Patrons of the Torah scroll are the highest representatives of the Federal Republic of Germany: Federal President Frank-Walter Steinmeier, President of the Bundestag Wolfgang Schäuble, Federal Chancellor Angela Merkel, Bundesrat President Reiner Haseloff and the President of the Federal Constitutional Court, Stephan Harbarth.

As representatives of all constitutional organs, we express with this unusual and in this form unique symbolic act the state's self-commitment to enable and protect Jewish life in Germany.

— Wolfgang Schäuble

Participating in the ceremony as representatives of Judaism in Germany were the President of the Central Council of Jews in Germany Josef Schuster, the Chairperson of the Jewish Community of Munich and Upper Bavaria Charlotte Knobloch and the Amberg Rabbi Elias Dray took part. Knobloch had also previously appeared as a speaker during the act of remembrance. For Josef Schuster, the "Sulzbacher Torah, which is over 200 years old, is a factual sign that Jewish life in Germany goes back a long way".

Under normal circumstances, it would have been customary for the sofer to lead the sponsors' hand in applying the missing letters. Since this was not possible due to the spacing rules during the COVID-19 pandemic, he wrote the letters himself. However, in return, the person chosen in each case symbolically held the Torah by its handle.

The last verses of the 5th Book of Moses read: "And there stood up henceforth no prophet in Israel like Moses, whom the Eternal would have known face to face (...) and with all the mighty power and the great acts of terror which Moses performed before the eyes of all Israel (Le-Ejnei Kol Israel)“, the last letters written during the ceremonial act.

Following the ceremony in the German Bundestag, the Sulzbach Torah scroll was initially put into storage. In October 2021, it was carried in a procession to the Amberg synagogue after a ceremony at the Amberg Congress Centre with the President of the Bavarian Landtag, Ilse Aigner, as guest of honour. There, its use in the holy service is planned.
