= Makkabi Frankfurt =

Jewish multi-sport club in Frankfurt, Germany

TuS Makkabi Frankfurt
- Turn- und Sportverein Makkabi Frankfurt 1965 e.V.
- Formation: 30 May 1965; 61 years ago
- Type: Sports club
- Headquarters: Frankfurt, Germany
- President: Alon Meyer
- Affiliations: Makkabi Deutschland
- Website: makkabi-frankfurt.de

Turn- und Sportverein Makkabi Frankfurt 1965 e.V., commonly known as TuS Makkabi Frankfurt or Makkabi Frankfurt, is a Jewish multi-sport club in Frankfurt, Germany. Founded in 1965, it reported more than 5,500 members in 28 departments in 2026 and describes itself as the largest Jewish sports club in Germany. The city of Frankfurt lists it among the city's largest sports clubs. It is a member of the umbrella organisation Makkabi Deutschland.

Membership is open to people of all backgrounds, and according to the club's president most members are not Jewish. The club's colours are blue and white, and its crest shows the word Makkabi in Hebrew together with the Star of David. The name refers to Judas Maccabeus (Hebrew: יהודה המכבי), a leader of the Maccabean Revolt against the Seleucid Empire. Football is the largest of the club's departments.

== History ==
TuS Makkabi Frankfurt was founded on 30 May 1965, the same year in which Makkabi Deutschland was re-established as the national Jewish sports federation. It was set up to give Jews in and around Frankfurt a place to play sport safely, and later opened to members of all backgrounds. The founders included the father of the current president, Alon Meyer. Dieter Graumann, later president of the Central Council of Jews in Germany, is a former head of the club.

In the 1980s the club lost its home ground at the Dachsberg in the Preungesheim district because of the construction of the A 661 autobahn. For the following four decades its departments were spread across venues throughout the city. The footballers were based at the Bertramswiese sports ground in the Dornbusch district, while the basketball and table tennis departments trained at the premises of the Jewish Community of Frankfurt.

Membership grew rapidly from the late 2010s, from about 1,600 in early 2019 to more than 4,500 by 2024 and more than 5,500 by 2026.

== Organisation ==
The club is governed by an executive board consisting of the president, Alon Meyer, and eight other members. Meyer is also president of Makkabi Deutschland.

== Facilities ==
=== Makkabi Campus ===
On 14 June 2026 the club opened the Makkabi Campus on Wilhelm-Epstein-Straße in the Ginnheim district, its first home of its own since the 1980s. The 24,000-square-metre (260,000 sq ft) site cost about €21 million, half of which was paid by the city of Frankfurt and half by the club and donors. It was designed by the Frankfurt practice Albert Speer & Partner, founded by Albert Speer Jr.

Because the club is Jewish, the campus was built with security measures including bulletproof glass and video surveillance, planned in coordination with the authorities. In addition to sport, the campus is used for educational work, including democracy education and programmes on preventing antisemitism in sport.

=== Other venues ===
In 2020 the club took over the Europa Tennis & Squash Park in the Bockenheim district, which it has since operated as the Makkabi Tennis & Squash Park. The site has five outdoor tennis courts, three indoor tennis courts and eight squash courts, and also houses a kosher-certified restaurant and bakery.

== Community work ==
Alongside regular training and competition, the club runs integrative and interfaith sports projects for children, young people and young refugees. It cooperates with municipal kindergartens, day-care centres and schools, and in particular with the institutions of the Jewish Community of Frankfurt.

In 2019 the club introduced what it calls its solidarity principle, under which anyone may take part in its sports programmes regardless of their financial circumstances. During school holidays it runs sports camps for children and young people.

=== Awards ===
In 2018 the club received the Frankfurt Diversity and Integration Prize for its community work, which focuses in particular on the prevention of antisemitism and racism. In 2022 the Frankfurter Rundschau charity Schlappekicker gave the club a special grant of €3,500 for its work with refugees from Ukraine. In 2022, 2023 and 2024 the club received the bronze Sterne des Sports award for its community engagement.

== Antisemitism ==
Players of the club, including non-Jewish members, have reported antisemitic abuse from opponents. In 2021 Deutsche Welle reported on a Makkabi Deutschland survey in which about two thirds of footballers at Makkabi clubs said they had experienced antisemitism, and quoted a Makkabi Frankfurt player describing insults during matches. In one case an opposing club suspended a player who had made antisemitic remarks after a match against Makkabi Frankfurt.

In February 2025 Meyer said that the club had recorded several antisemitic incidents each week since the Hamas-led attack on Israel of 7 October 2023 and the ensuing Gaza war.

== Notable former players ==
The following professional footballers played in the club's youth system:

- Faton Toski (born 1987), later played in the Bundesliga for Eintracht Frankfurt and internationally for Kosovo
- Tim Lemperle (born 2002), forward for 1. FC Köln and TSG Hoffenheim and Germany under-21 international
- Marvin Dills (born 2007), midfielder for Eintracht Frankfurt and United States youth international

== Makkabi tram ==
Since 2015 a Frankfurt U-Bahn vehicle of the Verkehrsgesellschaft Frankfurt (VGF) has run in a Makkabi livery. The vehicle, introduced to mark the club's 50th anniversary, is painted in the club's blue and white and carries its crest, its name and the motto Makkabi Chai ("Makkabi lives").

== See also ==
- Maccabi World Union
- TuS Makkabi Berlin
- List of Maccabi sports clubs and organisations
