= List of Maccabi sports clubs and organisations =

Maccabi (sometimes spelled Macabi, Makabi or Makkabi) may refer to:

- The Maccabi World Union, Maccabiah Games or any one of the following sport organizations around the world:

Club	Country	City	Sport	Description
Asociación Hebraica y Macabi	Uruguay	Montevideo	Basketball	Athletic and social gathering club for Jews in Uruguay
Brady Maccabi	England	Greater London	Association Football	Athletic and social gathering club for Jews in North London
Maccabi GB	England	England	Cricket & Association Football	Sports Clubs and Social Gathering for Jewish youth in across Great Britain.
Maccabi London	England	London	Cricket & Association Football	Athletic and social gathering club for Jewish youth in Northwest London.
Club Israelita Macabi de Mendoza	Argentina	Mendoza	Basketball	Professional basketball club
IK Makkabi Stockholm	Sweden	Stockholm	Association Football	Athletic and social gathering club for Jews in Stockholm.
SK Juda Makabi Novi Sad	(Socialist Federal Republic of Yugoslavia) Yugoslavia	Novi Sad	Association Football	Athletic and social gathering club for Jews in Novi Sad. Existed between 1920 and 1941.
KSC Maccabi Antwerp	Belgium	Antwerp	Association Football	Athletic and social gathering club for Jews in Antwerp.
Maccabi BBC Antwerp	Belgium	Antwerp	VBL – Flemish Basketball League	Athletic and social gathering club for Jews in Antwerp, which welcomes everybody.
Lithuanian Sports Club Makabi	Lithuania	Vilnius	Non-specific	Athletic and social gathering club for Jews in Lithuania.
Makabi Kaunas	Lithuania	Kaunas		Defunct
London Maccabi Lions	England	London	Association Football	Football club in the Hertfordshire Senior County League
Maccabi Ahi Nazareth	Israel	Nazareth	Association Football	Professional football team
Maccabi Ashdod	Israel	Ashdod	Basketball	Professional basketball club
Maccabi Ironi Ashdod	Israel	Ashdod	Association Football	Defunct professional football club
Maccabi Be'er Sheva	Israel	Be'er Sheva	Association Football	Professional football club
Maccabi București	Romania	Bucharest	Association Football	Defunct football club
Maccabi Cernăuți	Romania	Cernăuți	Association Football	Historic sport club (defunct)
Maccabi Budapest	Hungary	Budapest	Association Football	Defunct football club
Maccabi Brinkford Tbilisi	(Georgia (country)) Georgia	Tbilisi	Basketball	Professional basketball club
Maccabi Haifa	Israel	Haifa	Non-specific	Large sport club in Haifa
Maccabi Herzliya	Israel	Herzliya	Association Football	Professional football club
Maccabi Ironi Kiryat Ata F.C.	Israel	Kiryat Ata	Association Football	Defunct football club
Maccabi Ironi Tirat HaCarmel	Israel	Tirat Carmel	Association Football	Semi-professional football club
Maccabi Jaffa	Israel	Tel Aviv	Association Football	Semi-professional football club
Maccabi Kiryat Gat	Israel	Kiryat Gat	Association Football	Semi-professional football club
Maccabi Los Angeles	United States	Los Angeles	Association Football	Historic amateur football club
SC Maccabi Lyon	France	Lyon	Association Football	Amateur football club in Northeast border of Lyon and Villeurbanne
Maccabi Melbourne	Australia	Melbourne	Association Football	Defunct football club
Maccabi Moscow	Russia	Moscow	Association Football	Amateur football club
Maccabi Netanya	Israel	Netanya	Association Football	Professional football club
Macabi Noar	Argentina	Córdoba	Non-specific	The unique Jewish institution in Córdoba
Maccabi Paris	France	Paris	Association Football	Football club
Maccabi Petah Tikva	Israel	Petah Tikva	Association Football	Professional football club
Maccabi Rugby	Australia	Sydney	Rugby union	Rugby team that competes in NSWSRU
Maccabi Riga	Latvia	Riga	Association Football	Football team (1920s–1940), part of the Maccabi (Makabi) sports club
Maccabi Rishon LeZion	Israel	Rishon LeZion	Non-specific	Large sport organization in Rishon LeZion
Maccabi Sha'arayim	Israel	Rehovot	Association Football	Semi-professional football club
Maccabi Tel Aviv	Israel	Tel Aviv	Non-Specific	Large sport organization in Tel Aviv
Maccabi Tzur Shalom F.C.	Israel	Kiryat Bialik	Association Football	Football club
Maccabi Istanbul	Turkey	Istanbul	Non-Specific	Defunct sports club
Maccabi Toronto	Canada	Toronto	Non-Specific	Sport organization in Toronto with specialty in association football
Maccabi Thessaloniki	Greece	Thessaloniki	Non-specific	Sport organization
Maccabi Athens	Greece	Athens	Non-specific	Ping pong
Maccabi Yavne	Israel	Yavne	Association Football	Semi-professional football club
Makkabi Brünn	(Czech Republic) Czechoslovakia	Brno	Association Football	Defunct football club
Makkabi Frankfurt	Germany	Frankfurt	Non-specific	Sport organization
Makkabi Helsinki	Finland	Helsinki	Non-specific	Athletic and social gathering club for Jews in Helsinki
Maccabi München	Germany	Munich	Non-specific	Athletic and social gathering club for Jews in Munich
Sport Club Maccabi Bruxelles	Belgium	Brussels	Non-specific	Athletic and social gathering club for Jews in Brussels
Hakoah Wien	Austria	Vienna		
SC Maccabi Wien	Austria	Vienna	Association Football	Amateur football club
Organización Hebrea Macabi	Argentina	Buenos Aires	Association Football	Professional football club
Maccabi Düsseldorf	Germany	Düsseldorf	Association Football	Amateur football club
Makkabi Berlin	Germany	Berlin	Association Football	Amateur football club
Makabi Zagreb	(Socialist Federal Republic of Yugoslavia) Yugoslavia	Zagreb	Association Football	Defunct football club
Makabi Warsaw	Poland	Warsaw		

- Makabi Warszawa, founded in 1915 in Warsaw, Poland
