= Ohel Jakob synagogue (Munich) =

Synagogue in Munich, Germany

Ohel Jakob Synagogue
- The synagogue, in 2006

- Location of the synagogue in Bavaria

Religion
- Affiliation: Judaism
- Ecclesiastical or organisational status: Synagogue
- Status: Active

Location
- Location: Sankt-Jakobs-Platz, Munich, Bavaria
- Country: Germany
- Coordinates: 48°8′4″N 11°34′21″E

Architecture
- Architects: Rena Wandel-Hoefer; Wolfgang Lorch
- Type: Synagogue architecture
- Style: Modernist
- Groundbreaking: 2004
- Completed: 2006
- Construction cost: €57 million

Specifications
- Capacity: 550 worshippers
- Materials: Concrete, travertine stone

Ohel Jakob Synagogue (transliterated from Hebrew as "Jacob's Tent") is a Jewish congregation and synagogue, located at the Sankt-Jakobs-Platz in Munich, Germany. It was built between 2004 and 2006 as the new main synagogue for the Jewish community in Munich. The synagogue was inaugurated on 9 November 2006 on the 68th anniversary of the Kristallnacht.

The building is part of the new Jewish Center consisting of the synagogue, the Jewish Museum Munich and a community center.

== Building ==
The synagogue was designed by architects Rena Wandel-Hoefer and Wolfgang Lorch, who were awarded the contract on 6 July 2001 after an architectural design competition. The architects had previously completed the New Synagogue in Dresden. The topping out ceremony was celebrated on 25 October 2005. The opening ceremony was led by Charlotte Knobloch, president of Central Council of Jews in Germany and head of Munich's Orthodox Jewish community.

The building is a cubic concrete structure clad with travertine stone in its lower part and topped by a glass cube. The glass roof represents a tent (Ohel), symbolizing Moses' 40-year-journey through the desert. The main portal was manufactured in Budapest and features Hebrew letters depicting the Ten Commandments. The interior walls are paneled with warm cedar decorated with golden psalms.

The synagogue can seat 550 worshippers. It cost about €57 million (around US$72 million) to build and funding was provided by the city of Munich, the state of Bavaria, Munich's Jewish community and private donations.

Munich's original main synagogue was destroyed in June 1938 and stood a few blocks away from the new synagogue, on ground that is now a parking ramp.

=== Antisemitic attack ===
In 2003, German authorities uncovered a plot by a group of neo-Nazis to bomb the ceremony to lay the cornerstone for the building. Security concerns also led to the decision to house a memorial, to the more than 4,000 Jews of Munich who were killed in the Holocaust, in a tunnel between the synagogue and the Jewish community center.

== See also ==
- History of the Jews in Germany
- Jewish Museum Munich
- List of synagogues in Germany (in German)
