= Galiński =

Galinski or Galiński (feminine: Galińska; plural: Galińscy) is a surname. Notable people with the surname include:

- Adam Galinsky (born 1969), American social psychologist
- Edward Galiński (1926–1944), murdered in Auschwitz concentration camp
- Emilia Galińska (born 1992), Polish handball player
- Evelyn Hecht-Galinski (born 1949), German Jewish activist
- Heinz Galinski (1912–1992), German Jewish leader
- Karl Galinsky (born 1942), American Ancient Rome academic
- Marek Galiński (1974–2014), Polish mountain biker
- Marek Galiński (1951–1999), Polish wrestler
- Mary Galinski, professor of medicine
- Michael Galinsky (born 1969), American filmmaker
- Roman Galinski (1905–1974), Polish-American journalist
- Tom Gola (1933–2014), American basketball player and politician, family name Galinsky
- Yaakov Galinsky (1920–2014), rabbi

== See also ==
- Galińskie
