= Ernst Ludwig Ehrlich Scholarship Fund =

Scholarship fund in Germany

The Ernst Ludwig Ehrlich Scholarship Fund (German: Ernst Ludwig Ehrlich Studienwerk or ELES for short) is one of thirteen Federally-funded Scholarship Foundations in the Federal Republic of Germany. It is located in Berlin.

The Scholarship Fund was named after religious scholar and historian Ernst Ludwig Ehrlich (1921-2007).

== History ==
The Ernst Ludwig Ehrlich Studienwerk (ELES) was founded in 2008, and opened on 11 November 2009 by the then-Federal Education Minister Annette Schavan and the then-Central Council President Charlotte Knobloch. It was the twelfth German Scholarship Foundation to be created and supported by the Federal Ministry of Education and Research, and provides scholarships to gifted Jewish students and doctoral candidates.

Chairwoman of the Board
Dr. Anastassia Pletoukhina
Managing Director
Dr. Michal Or
Patron
Charlotte Knobloch
Information
Founded:	2008
Scholarship holders since founding:	1000 (2022)
Website:	eles-studienwerk.de

Ernst Ludwig Ehrlich (1921-2007) was a Berlin-born religious scholar and historian who experienced both the persecution and following rebuilding of the European Jewry in the 20th century. In memory of its namesake, ELES awards the Ernst Ludwig Ehrlich Medal for the Sciences and Arts. The winners of the prize have been Johanna Wanka (2010), Claudia Lücking-Michel (2012), and Monika Grütters (2014).

Renowned Jewish figures from sciences, arts, business, and public life are involved in the Scholarship Fund. The Patron is Charlotte Knobloch, the Chairwoman of the Board is Anastassia Pletoukhina, the Managing Director is Michal Or, the Advisory Board is headed by Frederek Musall, Jonas Fegert, Anna Schapiro.

== Scholarships and Support ==
ELES supports gifted Jewish students and doctoral candidates with German or EU citizenship during their education at universities, technical colleges and art and music colleges in Germany, or in another EU state or Switzerland, can apply. Research projects of Non-Jews can be supported if they deal with Jewish topics.

The scholarships are divided into two categories: student funding and doctoral student funding. The monthly sum that the scholarship holders receive are calculated on an individual basis using the BAföG rates. The maximum sum that scholarship holders within the student category could receive is €649 per month with a study allowance of €300 per month. The maximum sum for scholarship holders within the doctoral candidate category is €1,350 per month and a research fee of €100 EUR per month. ELES also supports the study and research ventures abroad of its scholarship holders.

In addition to financial support, ELES also offers its scholarship holders intellectual support; there are 14 annual Seminars centring on non-material matter. There also exists an international network that forms a central component of this intellectual support-structure: educational institutions in New York and Israel being central to this. The international network is strengthened by ELES' Benno Jacob and the Bertha Pappenheim Fellowship, which, working with the German Foreign Office, invites foreign Jewish scholars - future rabbis and cantors - to study in Germany. Another program, run in jointly with the Konrad-Adenauer-Stiftung, is aimed specifically at young Jewish journalists. As part of the intellectual support programme, ELES often works with other scholarship funds, e. g., Cusanuswerk, Evangelisches Studienwerk Villigst, Avicenna Studienwerk, the Friedrich Ebert Foundation, the Rosa Luxemburg Foundation, and the Studienstiftung des deutschen Volkes.

Since its foundation, the Ernst Ludwig Ehrlich Studienwerk has supported 581 scholarship holders, 87% of whom have migration backgrounds (as of May 2017).

== Initiatives ==
Since 2014, three initiative programmes have complimented the ELES study programme:

=== Hillel Deutschland ===
Hillel International is represented in 550 universities and colleges worldwide, making it the largest Jewish student organization. Through the work of Hillel International and the Ernst Ludwig Ehrlich Studienwerk, Hillel (Deutschland) was created in Germany. In 2014, Hillel Deutschland was officially by opened by Eric Fingerhut at the celebration of the fifth anniversary of ELES's founding, and since then, Hillel Deutschland has staged more than 610 events and attracted more than 2,700 students.

=== Dialogue/Perspectives ===
Dialogue/Perspectives: Religions and World Views in Conversation is a programme for the establishment of innovative forms of dialogue between people of difference religious beliefs and world views - it was created in 2015 and is a special programme of the Federal Ministry of Education and Research. With the creation of Dialogue/Perspectives ELES entered into dialogue with scholarship holders of different religious and ideological identities as well as with renowned scientists and discourse-defining experts on one of the most important topics of our time: the role of religions and worldviews for the individual and for society. The programme is aimed at the scholarship holders of all 13 federally funded scholarship funds who will be trained as future leaders in the field of interreligious dialogue.

In 2016, the German Chancellor Angela Merkel donated the EUR 10,000 Abraham Geiger Prize to the Dialogue/Perspectives programme. In 2017, Margot Käßmann praised Dialogue/Perspectives in an article for the Bild magazine as an example of successful interreligious dialogue facilitator

=== DAGESH. KunstLAB ELES ===
In 2016, DAGESH was created to offer the artists within the ELES Scholarship Fund greater public visibility, networking and support for their projects and the showcasing of their work. A creative period in Rheinsberg and a writing period in Buchen, are two retreats created by ELES to allow selected scholarship holders to spend one month in Rheinsberg and two weeks in Buchen exclusively for their artistic or scientific work. DAGESH also offers opportunities for artists to network and for exhibitions and public appearances in national and international contexts. Each year, DAGESH organises an Art Seminar and a Theatrical Seminar and publishes a regular catalog of documentaries, topics, discussions and programme events.

In 2017, the video artist Daniel Laufer produced for DAGESH a short film: 'Asylum in Paradise: Eight Visual Artists Based in Berlin'. In November 2017, the premiered at a DAGESH evening event.

Former ELES scholarship holders working in the arts include Max Czollek, Jeff Wilbusch, and Noam Brusilovsky.

== Publications ==
- Dmitrij Belkin (ed.): #Babel 21. Migration and the Jewish Community ( Series of the Ernst Ludwig Ehrlich Study Volume 2 ). Hentrich & Hentrich, Berlin 2017, ISBN 978-3-95565-240-1
- Lara Hensch, Dmitrij Belkin, Eva Lezzi (ed.): New Judaism - Old Remembering? Periods of Remembrance ( Series of the Ernst Ludwig Ehrlich Study Volume 1 ). Hentrich & Hentrich. Berlin 2017, ISBN 978-3-95565-209-8
