= UPJ =

UPJ may refer to:

- Union of Progressive Jews in Germany
- University of Pittsburgh at Johnstown
- Upjohn, stock ticker symbol
- Ureteropelvic junction (also "ureteral pelvic junction")
