= Charlotte Stein-Pick =

German writer (1899–1991)

Charlotte Stein-Pick (née Charlotte Baron; 22 October 1899 - 2 February 1991) was a German-Jewish emigrant. Today, her memoirs serve historians as a basis for research in many cases, and excerpts from them are often cited in her own German- but also English-language publications.

== Life ==
She was the daughter of the Munich dentist and Sanitätsrat (medical councillor, a courtesy title awarded by the king of Bavaria) Fritz Baron and, from 1921, the wife of the dentist Herbert Stein (1895–1950) from Sulzbach-Rosenberg, who ran his practice with his father-in-law in the house Sendlinger-Tor-Platz 6a. Already in her childhood she had to endure antisemitic clashes between playmates and schoolmates, which is probably why she was more sensitised to the coming danger than her husband.

From 1932 until its violent dissolution, she was chairwoman of the household school in Wolfratshausen founded by the League of Jewish Women in Munich. During the November pogroms in 1938, her husband's dental practice was closed and he was taken to the Dachau concentration camp. However, Stein-Pick obtained his release from the National Socialists.

After the couple had been expropriated in December 1938 - Stein was the last practising Jewish dentist in Munich - they both managed, with great difficulty, to emigrate to the US in 1939, which Stein-Pick had already begun to organise before the Pogrom Night. In her luggage she had two valuable Kiddush cups from the Synagogue of Sulzbach dating from 1764/65, which have in 2013 become part of an exhibition there. "Sulzbach was an oasis of peace, and I dearly loved this quiet little town."

In the US, the couple made a new start in Seattle, Washington State. Husband Herbert studied dentistry a second time and opened a new practice. Only after his early death (1950) did Stein-Pick visit her German homeland again alone in the following year, 1951. She last lived in Oakland, California.

In 1964, 25 years after her emigration, Stein-Pick wrote down her life story with the help of her diary entries. These memoirs remained unpublished for decades until the Munich journalist Christiane Schlötzer-Scotland met the now 90-year-old Stein-Pick in California. Stein-Pick entrusted her with the recorded memories as well as photos and other documents for publication under the title Meine verlorene Heimat (My Lost Home). The documents were shown in an exhibition in Munich in 2008/2009.

== Writings ==
- Charlotte Pick: Die verlorene Heimat [The lost home]. manuscript excerpt, in: Lixl-Purcell, Andreas, ed. (1992). Erinnerungen deutsch-jüdischer Frauen, 1900-1990 [Memories of Jewish-German women 1900-1990] (1. Aufl ed.). Leipzig: Reclam-Verlag. ISBN 3-379-01423-0. OCLC 26565574. p. 387–401
- Stein-Pick, Charlotte (1992). Meine verlorene Heimat [My lost home] (1. Aufl ed.). Bamberg: Bayerische Verlagsanstalt Bamberg. ISBN 3-87052-851-6. OCLC 27991589.

== Literature ==
- Short biografie in: Max Kreutzberger: Leo Baeck Institute of Jews from Germany, New York 1970, Seite 467 Digitalisat
- Gudrun Maierhof: Selbstbehauptung im Chaos. Frauen in der jüdischen Selbsthilfe (Self-Assertion in Chaos. Women in Jewish Selfsupport), 2002, Seite 124 Digitalisat
