= Fritz Neuland =

Bavarian lawyer, Jewish leader and politician (1889-1969)

Fritz Neuland (30 January 1889 – 4 November 1969) was a Bavarian lawyer, Jewish leader, and Senator.

In the 1920s, he had a law office in Munich, together with the later Bavarian Prime Minister Wilhelm Hoegner.

After surviving World War II as a forced labourer, he returned to Munich, where he became President of the Jewish community.

From 1951 until his death in 1969, he served as a Bavarian Senator.

Neuland married a Christian woman named Margarethe, who converted to Judaism upon marrying Neuland. They had a daughter, Charlotte Knobloch, who later became President of the Central Council of Jews in Germany.
