= Union of Progressive Jews in Germany =

German Jewish organization

Union progressiver Juden in Deutschland
- Theology: Reform Judaism
- President: Irith Michelsohn
- Associations: World Union for Progressive Judaism
- Region: Germany, Austria
- Headquarters: Diesterwegstraße 7, Bielefeld
- Origin: 27 June 1997; Synagogue Beth Shalom, Munich
- Congregations: 26
- Members: ≈5,200
- Official website: www.liberale-juden.de

The Union progressiver Juden in Deutschland (UPJ; "Union of Progressive Jews in Germany") is a "Körperschaft des öffentlichen Rechts", a publicly chartered association, founded in 1997 as the congregational arm of Liberal (also Progressive or Reform) Judaism in Germany. It is headed by Irith Michelsohn and has around 5,200 members. It is an affiliate of the World Union for Progressive Judaism. Rabbi Walter Homolka was former President and was also the most senior rabbinic figure associated with the UPJ, and the Abraham-Geiger-Kolleg serves as rabbinical seminary since 1999.

Liberal – known internationally also as Reform or Progressive – Judaism has a long history in Germany. Abraham Geiger, Samuel Holdheim and the other great Reform rabbis considered founders of the movement led it in the mid-19th century. After the 1844-46 synods, the term "Liberal" substituted the formerly common "Reform" to denote the relative moderation maintained in communities which remained unified. Only the semi-independent, splinter Reform Congregation in Berlin followed a radical line. The Liberals did not formally consolidate as a denomination, but were rather a tendency within communal frameworks. Their focal point was the Hochschule für die Wissenschaft des Judentums, their seminary. In 1898, Rabbi Heinemann Vogelstein was determined to counter conservative elements and formed a Liberal rabbinical association, Union of Liberal Rabbis. In 1908 a congregational arm followed, the Union for Liberal Judaism in Germany. These were founding members of the WUPJ in 1926. After World War II, the movement slowly recovered.

The publication work of the union began in 1997 with Seder ha-Tefillot, the Jewish prayer book by Jonathan Magonet in cooperation with Walter Homolka, translated from the Hebrew by Annette M. Böckler. In 1998 a Passover Haggadah was published. From 1999 to 2004 Annette M. Böckler translated W. Gunther Plaut's commentary on the Torah into German.

The Central Council of Jews in Germany (Zentralrat der Juden in Deutschland) rejected the association and insisted on a single representative voice for Jewish organisations. In particular this concerned the contract with the government, signed with the Central Council on 27 January 2003, and its associated aid money.

In April 2004 open hostility broke out between the president of the Central Council, Paul Spiegel, and then chairman of the UPJ, Jan Mühlstein. Mühlstein called for financial equality between the Liberal Jewish organisations regarding the distribution of 3 million Euros of state funding annually, set by a contract with the government. On 20 November 2005 two Jewish State Associations with numerous congregations of the Union were absorbed into the Central Council, after the status of a corporate body of public rights was conferred to them. The Union is currently participating in the state funding through the Central Council.

Unlike Reform and Liberal Jews in the United States and the United Kingdom, the UPJ does not recognize people of patrilineal Jewish descent as Jewish.
