= Villa ten Hompel =

Coordinates: 51.9663°N 7.64653°E

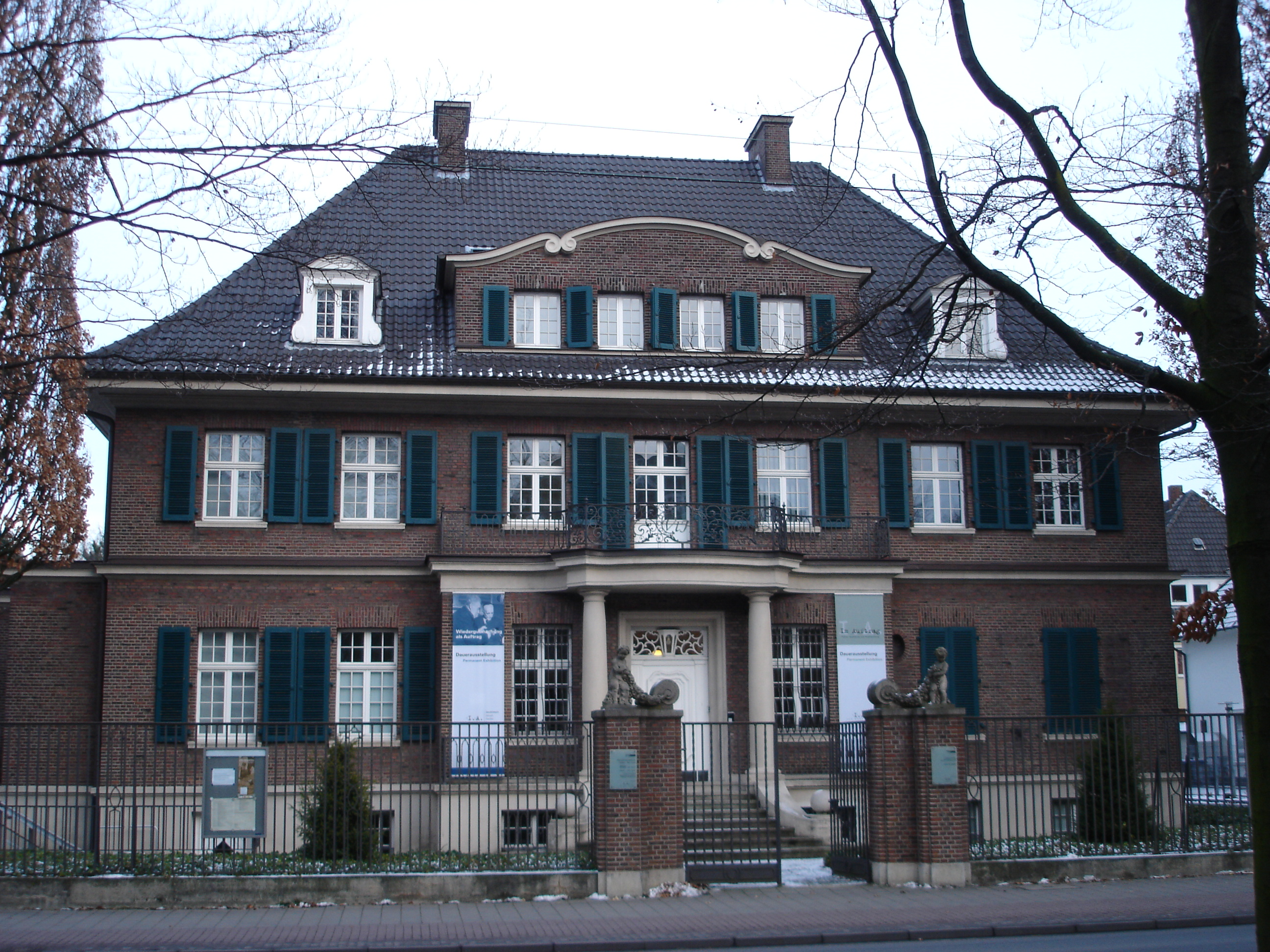
Villa ten Hompel

The Villa ten Hompel is a memorial site for offenses committed by the police and government administration during the National Socialist period in the city of Münster, located in the German state of North Rhine-Westphalia.

The Villa ten Hompel was named after its builder, the industrial merchant Rudolf ten Hompel from Münster, and was constructed from 1924 on.

Ten Hompel was one of the richest citizens of Münster and was co-owner of the “Wicking-Werke”, the biggest combine of cement factories in Germany from this time period. Furthermore, he was a representative of the Catholic Centre Party in the German Reichstag from 1920 until 1928.

The Villa and its ample gardens were often used for parties and other social gatherings and were therefore equipped very luxuriously. During the Great Depression at the beginning of the 1930s, ten Hompel's “Cement Empire” collapsed. In 1935, the former Chief Executive ten Hompel was convicted of embezzlement, bankruptcy offense, postponement of fortune, and forgery of documents by the regional superior court in Münster and was sentenced to three years in prison and a fine of 22,000 Reichsmark. In 1939, the Villa became property of the National Treasury and Rudolf ten Hompel moved to Munich, where he died in 1948.

In 1940 the Ordnungspolizei (Uniformed Police) moved into the Villa and made it the headquarters of the sixth military district, which contained the whole of North Rhine-Westphalia and the area around the nearby city of Osnabrück and parts of Belgium. During the war, police guards were sent by the Villa to supervise deportation trains, as well as the Arbeitserziehungslager, or worker education camps.

The Chief Commander of the Ordnungspolizei supervised nearly 200,000 men. In 1940 the Major General of the police, Heinrich Lankenau, was appointed as Chief Commander of the Ordnungspolizei. In 1942 Lankenau was replaced by Major General d.P. Kurt Göhrum. In the fall of 1944 Lieutenant General Reiner Liessem held office until the end of the Second World War. Liessem moved the headquarters of the Ordnungspolizei to Düsseldorf.

After the Second World War the Villa ten Hompel served as headquarters for the state police, and from autumn 1946 the criminal police. But this criminal police unit was combined with the Düsseldorf criminal police in October 1946, and the criminal police of Münster withdrew from the Villa. Until 1953, the water police was also stationed there. Afterwards, the water police headquarters were moved to Duisburg.

Beginning in 1953, the district government's Reparations Department took up residence in the Villa. It was responsible for the facilitation of reparations payments to victims of National Socialism and their surviving family members. In the years until 1968, 12,000 individuals applied for such payments, to which 100,000,000 Reichsmark were distributed altogether.

At the end of the 1990s the municipality of Münster bought the Villa in order to set up a memorial site dedicated to research concerning the attitudes of police and public administration and the ways in which they carried out their work. Lord Mayor Berthold Tillmann inaugurated the first exhibition on 13 December 1999 in the presence of the Minister President of North Rhine-Westphalia, Wolfgang Clement, and the President of the Central Council of Jews in Germany, Paul Spiegel. Apart from the permanent exhibition Im Auftrag (On Behalf Of), the Villa presents exhibitions that deal with subjects such as National Socialist war crimes and police or administrative history. Besides the exhibitions, there is a library and archive specialized in these topics. The Villa works closely with the local university, with schools and with the police.
