= Werner Nachmann =

German entrepreneur and politician (1925–1988)

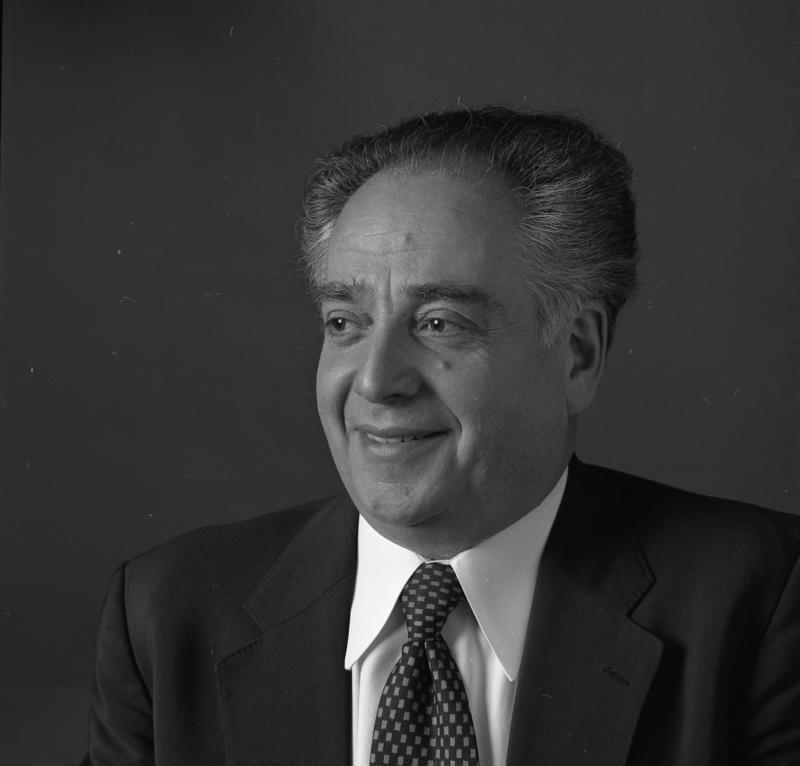
Werner Nachmann (1978)

Werner Nachmann (12 August 1925 – 21 January 1988), was a German entrepreneur and politician, and was president of the Central Council of Jews in Germany (Zentralrat der Juden in Deutschland) from 1969 to 1988. He was born in Karlsruhe.

In 1938 Nachmann fled to France. He returned to Germany in 1945 as an officer of the French army. He established himself again in Karlsruhe, where he developed his family business. From 1961 to 1988 he was the chairman of the Jewish municipality in Karlsruhe and the advisor on mikvah affairs. In 1962 he became a member of the Central Council of Jews in Germany. In 1965 he was selected to join its board of directors and from 1969 onwards he held the presidency. He is considered as an important pioneer of renewed cooperation between the authorities of the Federal Republic of Germany and German-Jewish organizations. For his work Nachmann was often honored during his lifetime, but criticism rose sharply from parts of the German-Jewish community in the early seventies as some found his efforts towards Jewish-German reconciliation as lacking sufficient distance to Germany.

In 1972, he served on the organizing committee of the 1972 Summer Olympics in Munich. He was also a member of the Israeli delegation. In 1986, he received the Theodor Heuss prize for his services to Jewish-German reconciliation and the peaceful coexistence of Jews and Christians in the Federal Republic of Germany. After his death in 1988, Nachmann was loudly condemned when it was discovered that from 1981 to 1987 he had defrauded about 33 million DM ($17 million in U.S. dollars at the time) from a German government fund intended for victims of the Nazis. The actual whereabouts of the funds remain unknown. Nachmann's successor in office, Heinz Galinski, strove intensively for many years to clear up the affair.

Nachmann died at the age of 62, from heart failure.

In 2017, his son, Marc Nachmann, was named the co-head of the investment-banking unit at Goldman Sachs.

== Notes and references ==
Preceded by Herbert Lewin	President of the Central Council of Jews in Germany; 1969–1988	Succeeded by Heinz Galinski
