= Synagogue of Sulzbach =

Former synagogue, now museum, in Sulzbach-Rosenberg, Germany

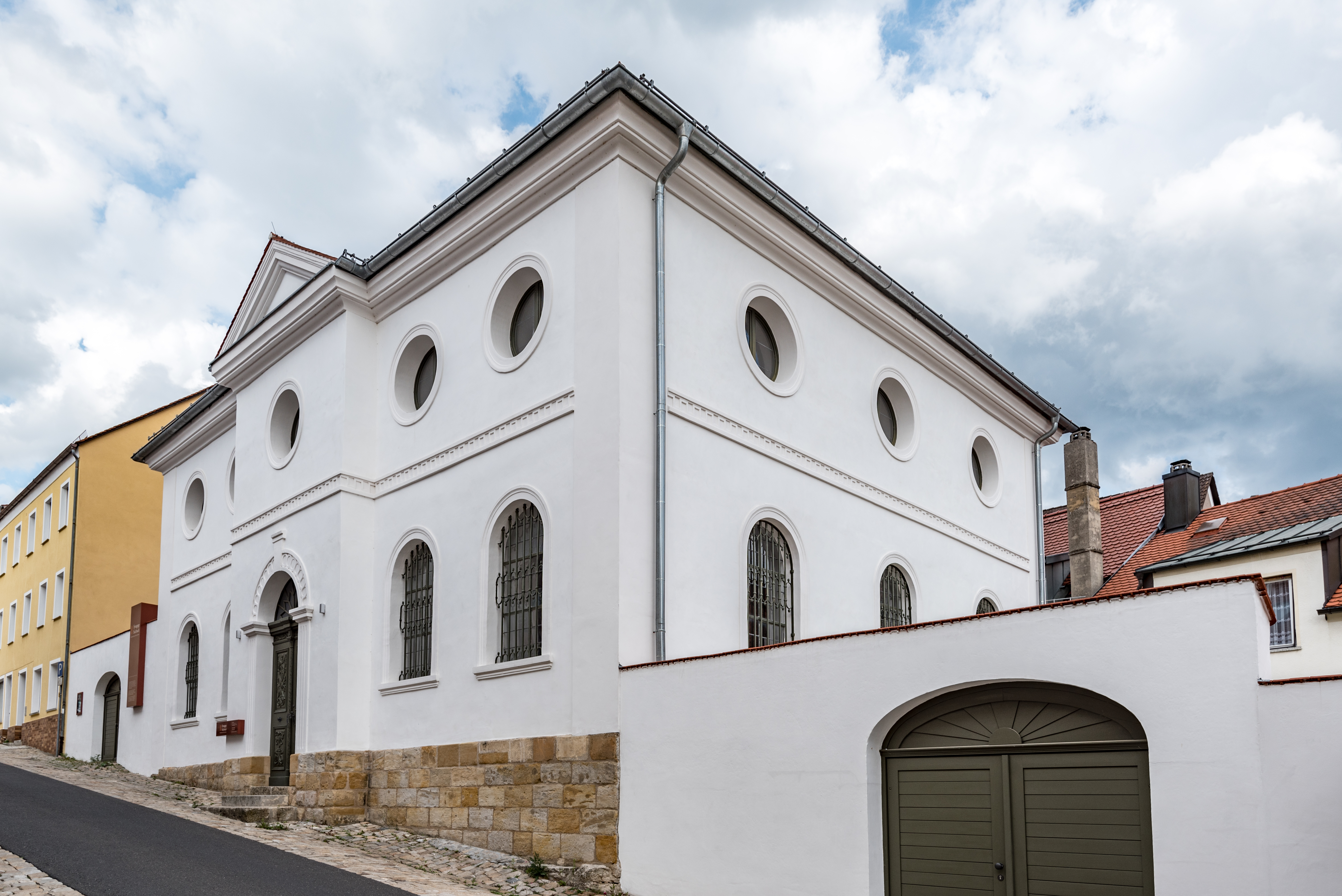
- The former synagogue, now museum, in 2018

- Location of the former synagogue, in Bavaria

Religion
- Affiliation: Judaism (former)
- Rite: Nusach Ashkenaz
- Ecclesiastical or organizational status: Synagogue (1824–1930); Residence (1950–2008); Jewish museum (since 2013)
- Status: Closed (as a synagogue); Repurposed

Location
- Location: Synagogenstraße 9, Sulzbach-Rosenberg, Bavaria
- Country: Germany
- Interactive map of Synagogue of Sulzbach
- Coordinates: 49°30′16″N 11°44′22″E

Architecture
- Type: Synagogue architecture
- Style: Neoclassicism
- Established: c. 1680s (as a congregation)
- Completed: 1687 (first building); 1737 (destroyed by fire); 1824 (current building)
- Materials: Stone

The Synagogue of Sulzbach is a former Jewish congregation and synagogue located in the town of Sulzbach-Rosenberg, in Bavaria, Germany. Built in 1822 on the site of two earlier synagogues, the building was abandoned in 1930, and was subsequently repurposed as a private residence form the 1950s, and returned to the Jewish community for use as a Jewish museum and community center since 2013.

== Description ==
After the Sulzbach town fire of 1822, the synagogue was rebuilt on the basis of the burnt-down Baroque predecessor building in Neoclassicism style as a Saalbau. It was consecrated in 1824. The architect of the Maisel Synagogue in Prague, Alfred Grotte, described it in 1913 as "one of the most beautiful synagogue buildings in Bavaria, perhaps even in Germany." The overbuilding, especially from the 1950s, was reversed and the original state restored as part of a redevelopment from 2010 to 2013. The preliminary investigation for the redevelopment revealed interesting finds such as the corner lesene or the belt cornice in the form of a "Greek" battlement meander as well as a marriage stone on the north façade.

== History ==
Until the first synagogue was built in Sulzbach in 1687, the Jewish community of Sulzbach met in a prayer room set up by the Jewish Bloch family. Due to its poor structural condition, it was replaced as early as 1737 by a new Baroque building in today's Synagogenstraße. This burnt down in the town fire of 1822. Financed by donations, the present building was consecrated on August 31, 1824. After having been the centre of the Sulzbach community for over a hundred years, it was abandoned in 1930 and sold to the city of Sulzbach for a symbolic price. Then the Jewish community had dwindled to a very small group. They sold the building under the condition that the synagogue would only be used for cultural purposes. Therefore, the Sulzbach City Museum was established in it. This circumstance saved the synagogue from destruction during the November Pogroms 1938.

The 18th century Sulzbacher Torah was brought to the synagogue in Amberg, where it survived the National Socialist Kristallnacht pogrom in 1938 and lay unnoticed for decades in a cabinet until 2015. After a restoration the finalisation was part of a ceremony in the German Reichstag in January 2021 with Chancellor Angela Merkel among the dignitaries who took part in the ceremony.

After 1945, the synagogue building was confiscated and transferred to the Jewish Restitution Successor Organization, which administered the assets of heirless Jewish victims of National Socialism. The organisation sold the building to private individuals in 1950, who converted it into a residential building in 1951. The original substance was largely preserved. From 2008 to 2013, the synagogue, funded by the Bayerische Landesstiftung and the LEADER programme, renovated as a listed building and converted into a meeting centre. At the inauguration ceremony on 31 January 2013, Charlotte Knobloch representing the World Jewish Congress and the Bavarian State Secretary for Culture Bernd Sibler, among others, spoke to the guests.

== Gallery ==
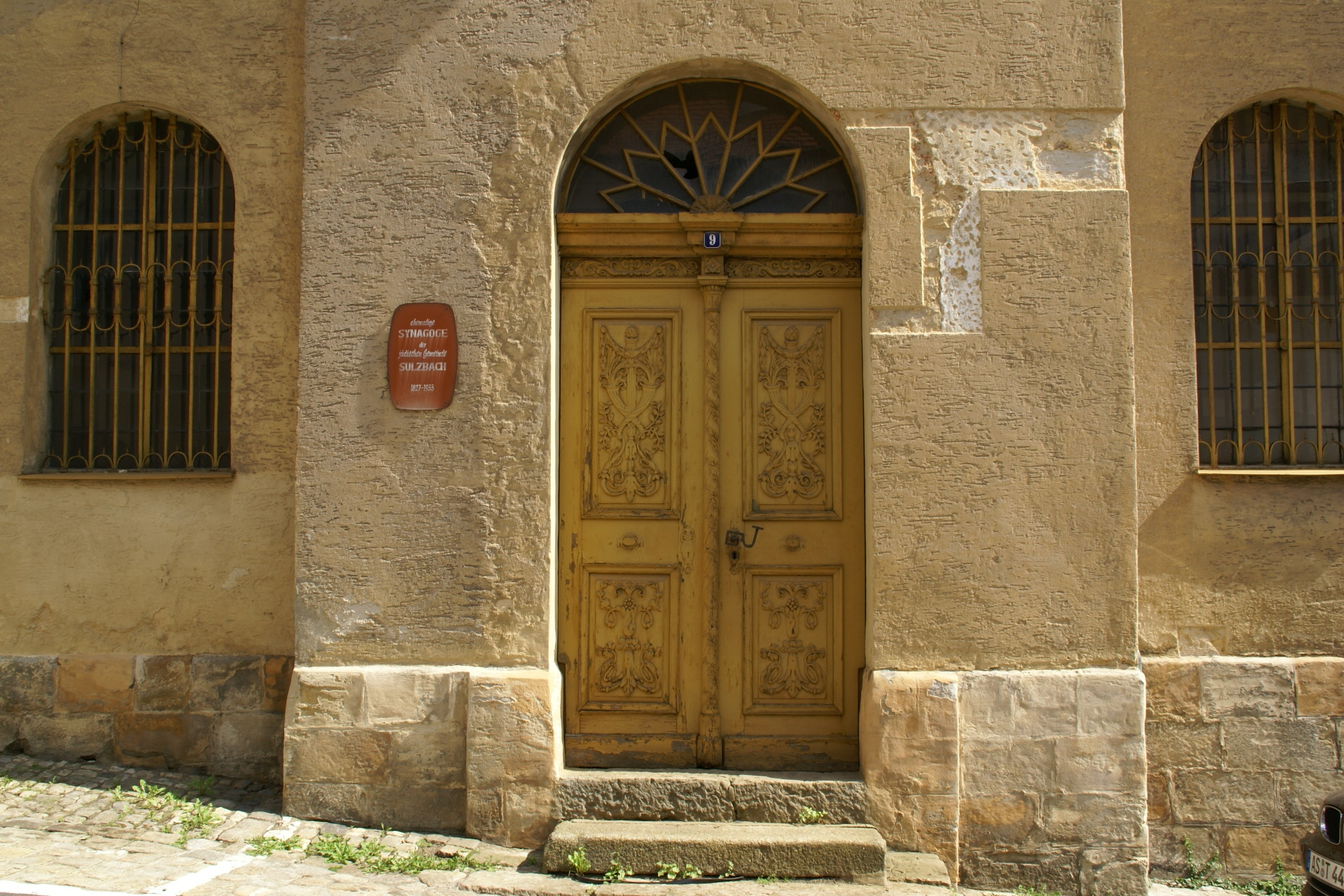
The original portal of the synagogue before the restoration

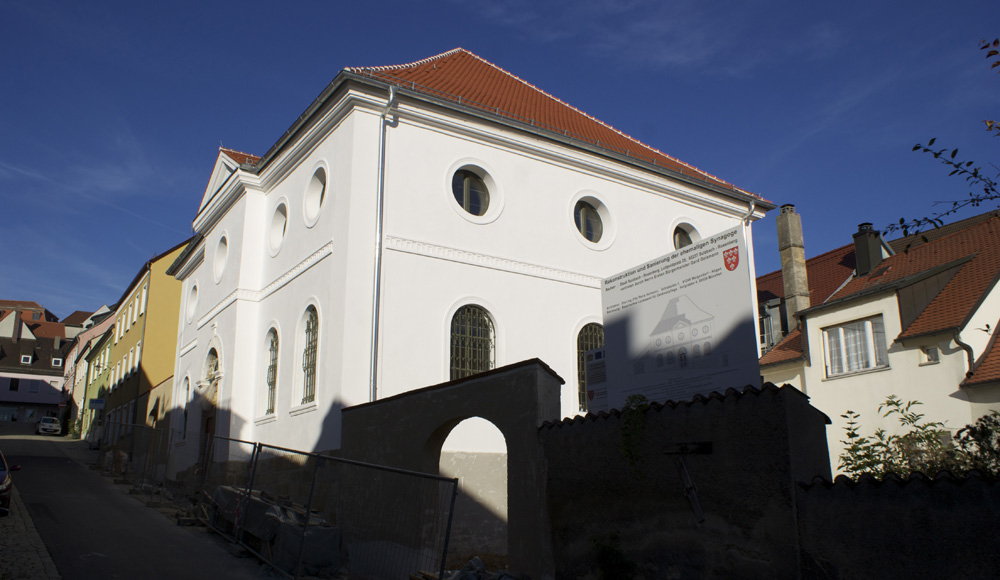
Not long before completion of the renovation work, September 2012

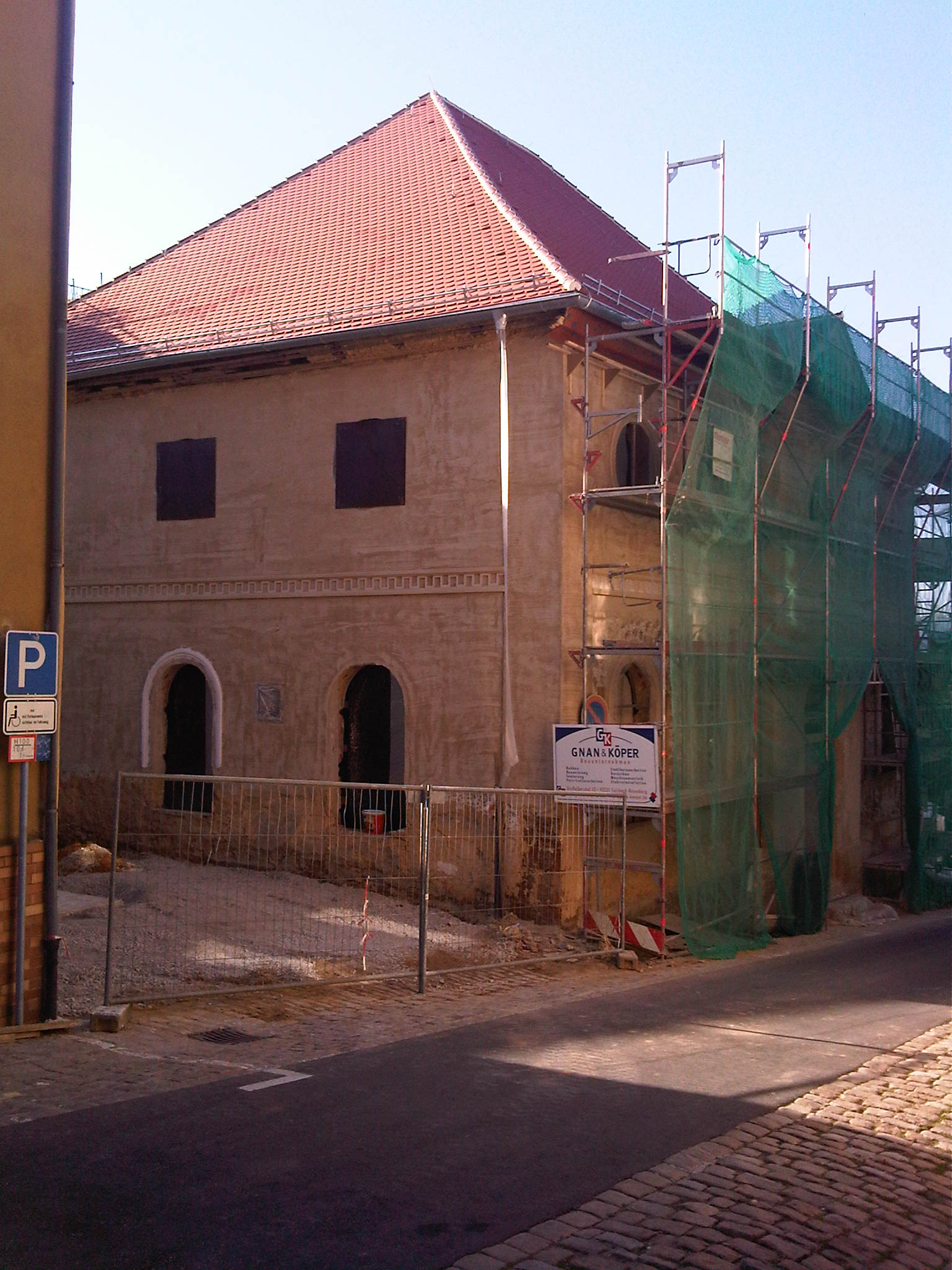
Status of the renovation work, October 2011

== See also ==
- History of the Jews in Germany
- List of synagogues in Germany (in German)
- Sulzbacher Torah
