= Heinz Galinski =

President of the Central Council of Jews in Germany (1912–1992)

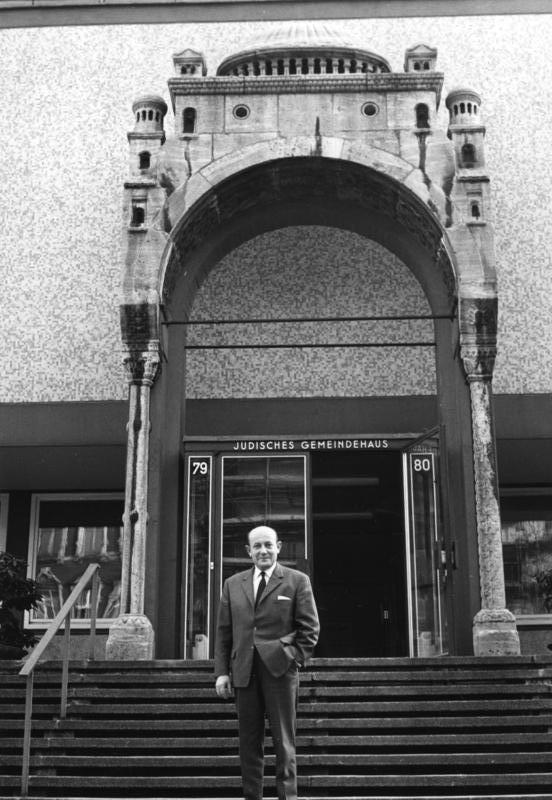
- Galinski in front of the Jewish Community Center in Berlin
- Born: 28 November 1912; Marienburg, West Prussia, German Empire (now Malbork, Poland)
- Died: 19 July 1992 (aged 79); Berlin, Germany

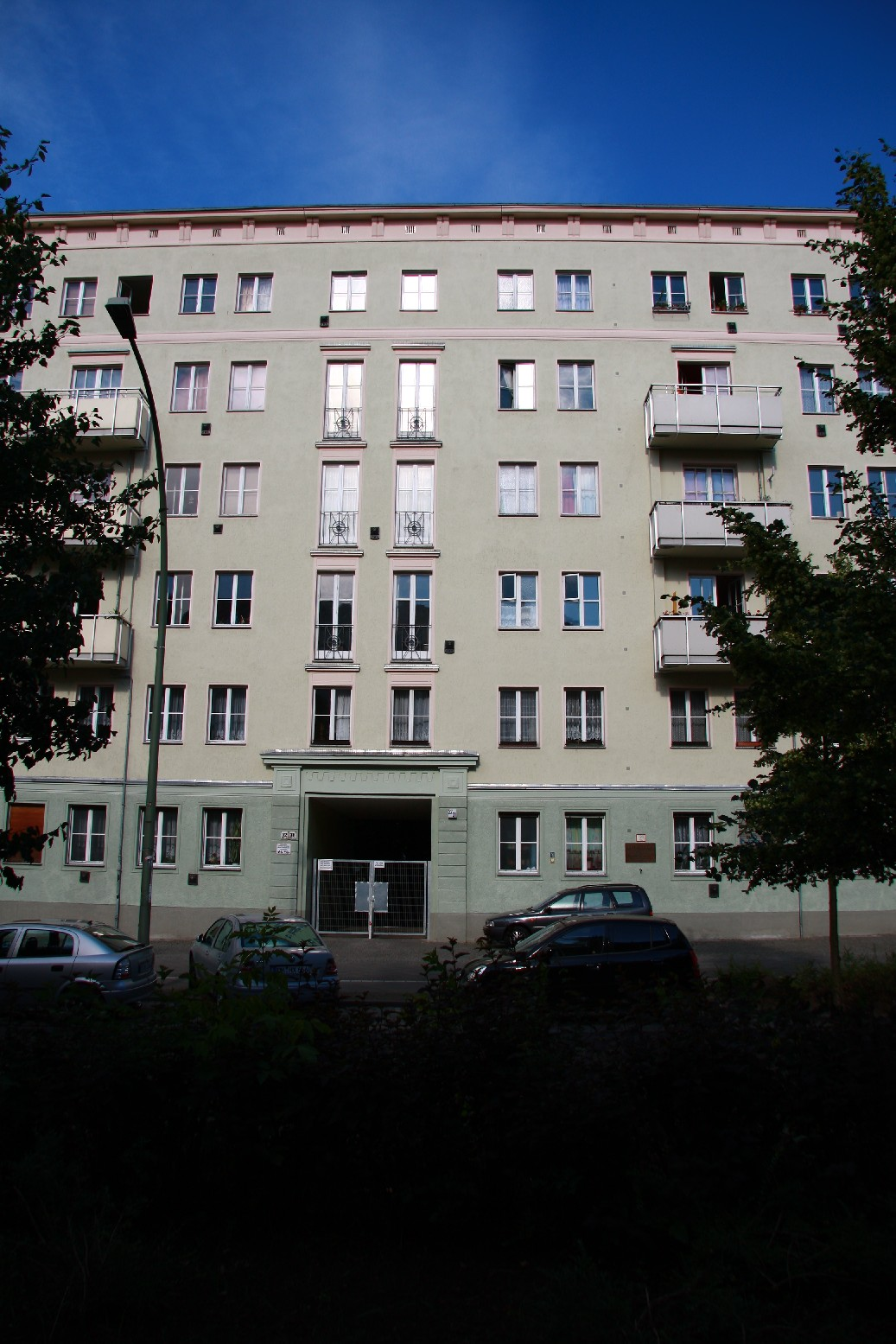
Galinski's residence in Berlin until his deportation in 1943

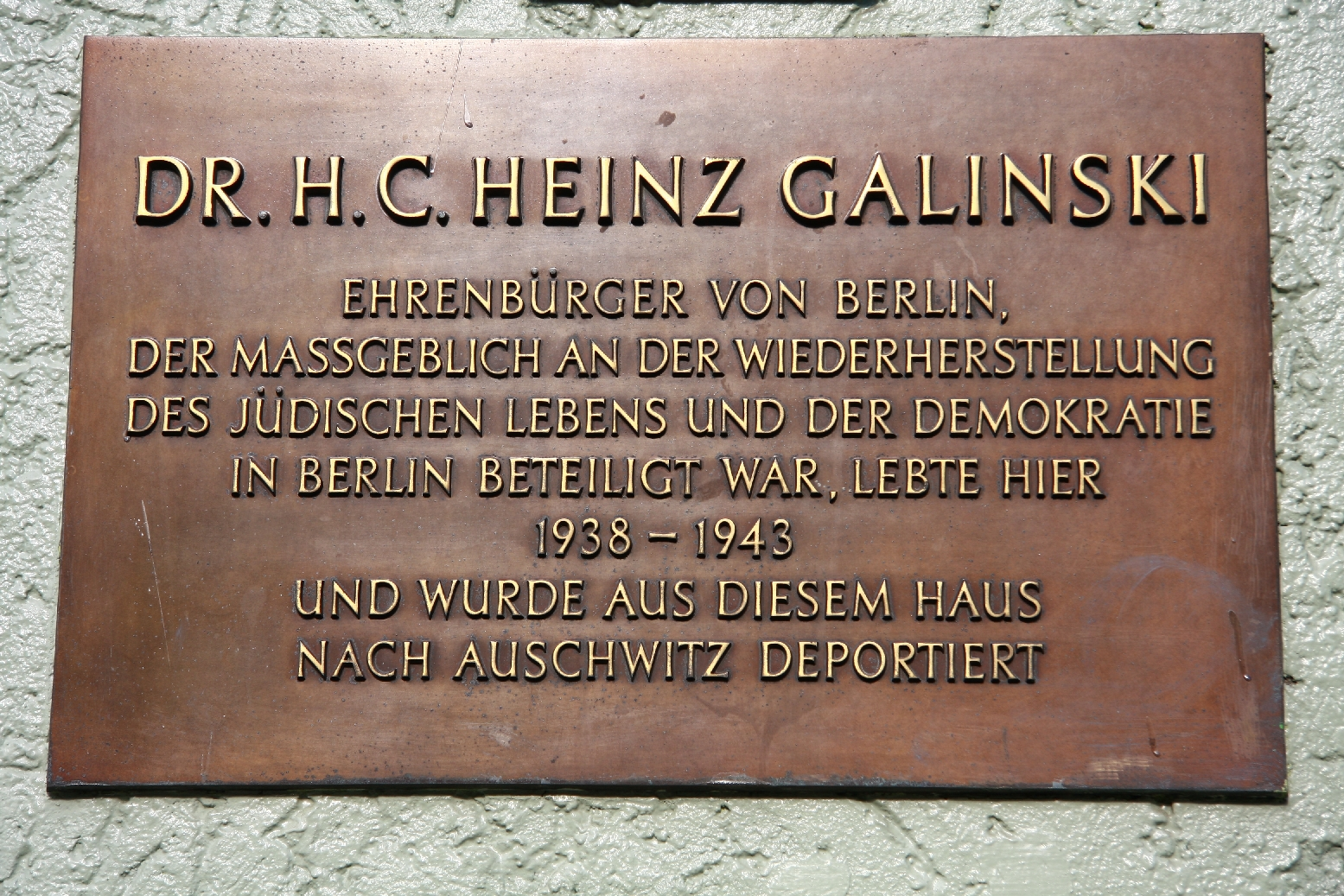
Memorial plate

Heinz Galinski (28 November 1912 – 19 July 1992) was president of the Central Council of Jews in Germany (Zentralrat der Juden in Deutschland) from 1954 to 1963 and 1988 until his death in 1992, and Holocaust survivor.

== Early life ==
Galinski was born in Marienburg (Malbork) in what was then West Prussia. His father was a businessman World War I veteran. After completing his Abitur, Galinski started an apprenticeship as a textile salesman, starting work in Rathenow in 1933. In 1938, he moved to Prenzlauer Berg, Berlin, however, he was conscripted into forced labor in 1940. In 1943, he was deported to Auschwitz. After also spending time in the concentration camps Buchenwald and Bergen-Belsen he was liberated by British troops on 20 April 1945. Unlike many other Holocaust survivors, Galinski remained in Germany after the end of World War II.

== Career ==
Immediately after the end of the war, Galinski took up prominent roles in several antifascist organizations, including the Union of Persecutees of the Nazi Regime. From 1949 to 1992, he was chairman of the Jewish congregation of Berlin. In 1987, Galinski became an honorary citizen of the city. From 1954 to 1963, he was the first president of the Central Council of Jews in Germany. In 1988, he then succeeded Werner Nachmann as the head of the Central Council of Jews, the most important Jewish organization in Germany; he kept this position until his death in 1992 in Berlin.

== Awards ==
Beginning in 1989, the Heinz-Galinski-Preis was awarded in his name. In 1995, the Heinz-Galinski Schule, a Jewish Elementary school in Berlin opened in his name.

In September and November 1998, Galinski's grave was the victim of two bombings, which both completely destroyed his grave stone. The motivation behind these attacks was probably anti-Semitism, but the crimes have not been solved.

Galinski's daughter Evelyn Hecht-Galinski is an outspoken critic of Israeli politics.

== See also ==
- Galinski
- Union of Persecutees of the Nazi Regime

== Notes and references ==
Jewish titles
Preceded by Werner Nachmann	President of the Central Council of Jews in Germany; 1988–1992	Succeeded by Ignatz Bubis
