= Jewish Museum Munich =

Museum in Munich, Germany

Coordinates: 48°8′4″N 11°34′21″E

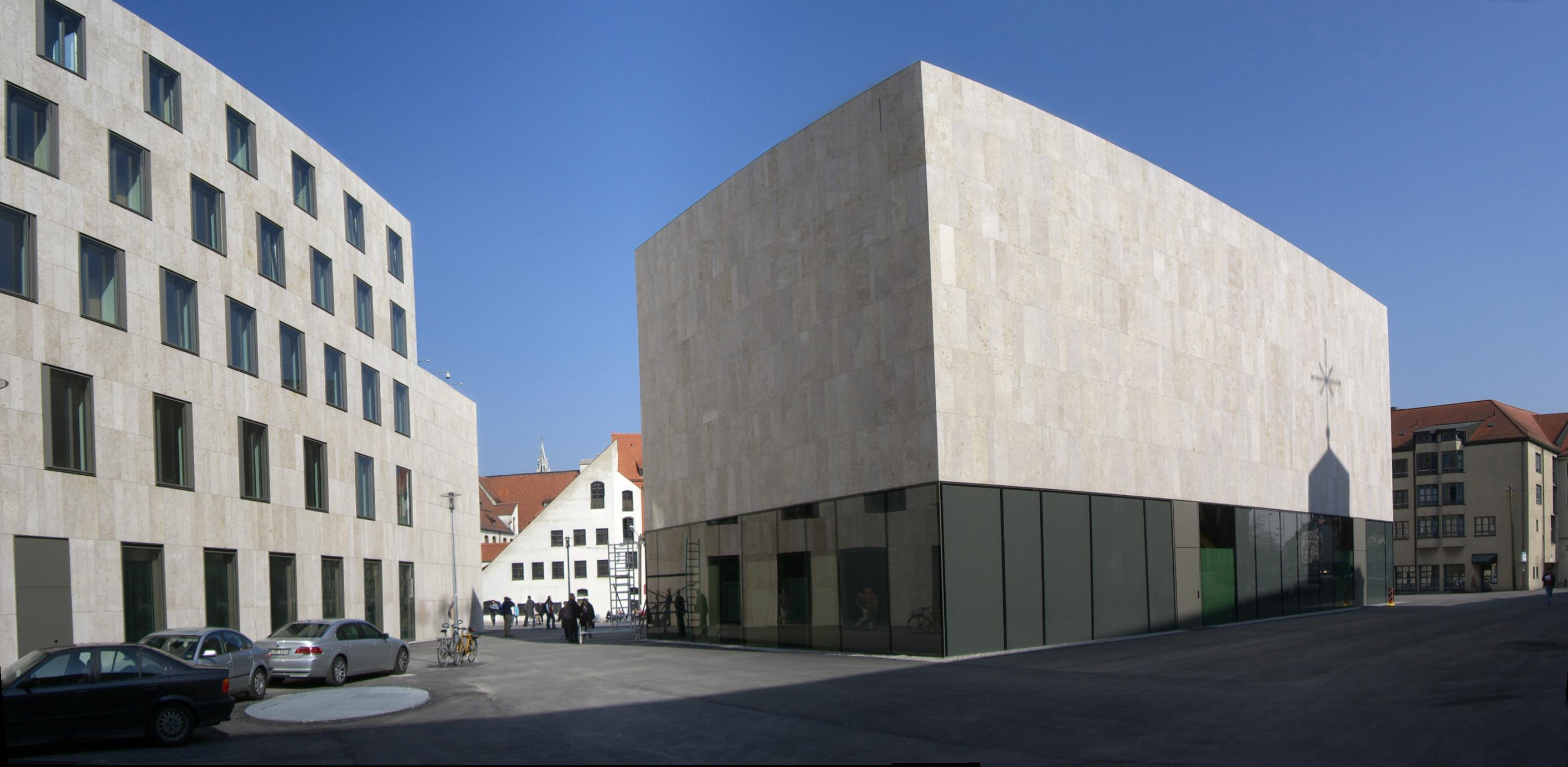
Jewish Community Center (left) and Jewish Museum Munich (right).

Jewish Museum Munich

The Jewish Museum Munich (Hebrew: המוזיאון היהודי במינכן), provides an overview of Munich’s Jewish history and is part of the city's new Jewish Center located at Sankt-Jakobs-Platz in Munich, Germany. It is situated between the main Ohel Jakob synagogue and the Jewish Community Center which is home to the Jewish Community of Munich and Upper Bavaria and houses a public elementary school, a kindergarten, a youth center as well as a community auditorium and a kosher restaurant. The museum was built from 2004 until its inauguration on 22 March 2007 and is run by the city of Munich.

== History ==
While there have been plans for a Jewish Museum dating back as far as 1928, the project did not gain significant momentum until the early 1980s when gallery owner Richard Grimm opened a private Jewish museum in a small space on Maximilianstraße. As the private collection gained popularity the need for a larger, public museum became apparent. However, Grimm's private museum closed after ten years for financial reasons and the Jewish community transferred the collection to a provisional exhibition space at Reichenbachstraße 27 where the Museum of the City of Munich presented exhibitions and events in collaboration with the City Archives, until the spring of 2006. It was then decided to build a municipal Jewish Museum as part of the new Jewish Center at Sankt-Jakobs-Platz.

As an alternative to the mandatory national military service, young Austrians have the opportunity to serve as Austrian Holocaust Memorial Servants at the Jewish Museum Munich.

== Building ==
The Jewish Museum Munich is part of a complex consisting of three buildings and was designed by architects Rena Wandel-Hoefer and Wolfgang Lorch who were awarded the contract after an architecture competition on 6 July 2001. The museum is designed as a freestanding cube with a transparent ground floor lobby. The two top floors house changing exhibitions, a learning center, and a library. The museum’s permanent exhibition is located on the lower level. It cost about €17.2 million to build with funding provided by the city of Munich.

== Exhibitions ==
The permanent exhibition provides an overview of Munich’s Jewish history with a special focus on the Jewish religion, its annual festivals and rites of passage (circumcision, bar and bat mitzvah, marriage, death).
