= Claudia Lücking-Michel =

German politician and theologian

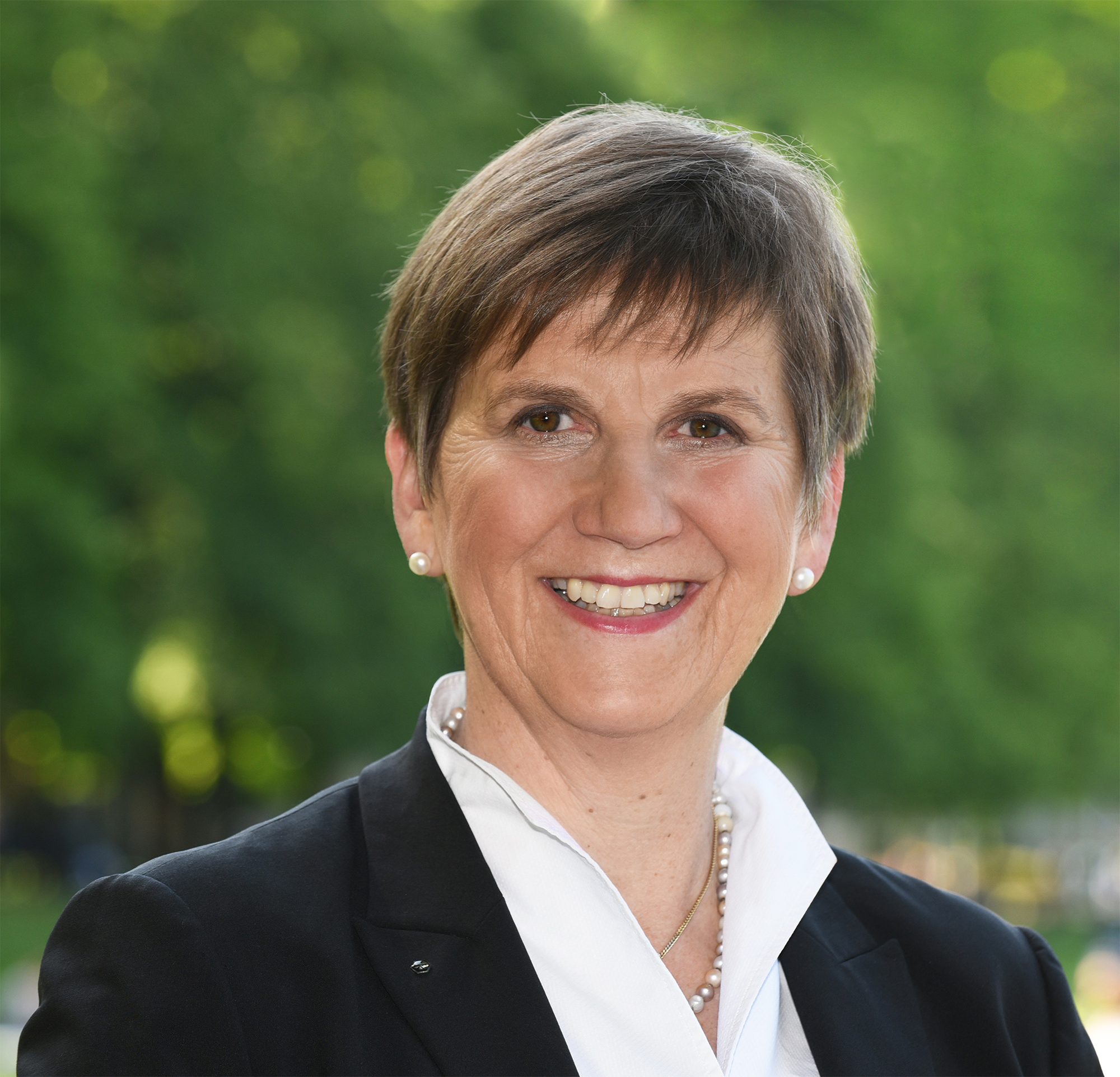
Lücking-Michel in 2017.

Claudia Maria Lücking-Michel (née Claudia Maria Lücking in 1962) is a retired German politician of the Christian Democratic Union (CDU). From 2013 to 2017, she was member of the Bundestag and from 2005 to 2021, vice president of the Central Committee of German Catholics.

== Personal life ==
Lücking-Michel was born on 4 February 1962 in Dortmund and grew up in Menden (Sauerland) where she got her high school diploma in 1981. She then studied history and theology at the Westfälische Wilhelms-Universität in Münster, the Abbey of the Dormition in Jerusalem and the University of Tübingen.

In the 1990s, she worked at the Cusanuswerk, a sponsor of gifted Catholic students and Misereor a catholic development aid organisation.

She is married to historian Andreas Michel and has three children.

== Political career ==
Lücking-Michel joined the CDU in 2004 and was a member of the German Bundestag from 2013 to 2017. In November 2020, she announced that she would seek re-election, but her party didn't select her as a candidate.

== Honors ==
- 2006: Bundesverdienstkreuz by German president Horst Köhler.
- October 2012: Ernst-Ludwig-Ehrlich-Medaille for arts and sciences.

== Publications (selection) ==
Dissertation

- Konkordanz und Konsens. Zur Gesellschaftstheorie in der Schrift "De concordantia catholica" des Nicolaus von Cues (= Bonner dogmatische Studien, Bd. 16). Würzburg 1994.

As publisher

- mit Thomas Fliethmann: Im Dienst der Armen. Entwicklungsarbeit als Selbstvollzug der Kirche (= Schriften des Instituts für Christliche Sozialwissenschaften, Bd. 26). Münster 1992.
- mit Josef Wohlmuth: Inspirationen. Beiträge zu Wissenschaft, Kunst, Gesellschaft und Spiritualität. Paderborn 2006.

Essays

- Für eine dialogische Kirche. Genese, Anliegen und Wirkung öffentlicher Erklärungen im Interesse des Dialogs in der Kirche. In: Gebhard Fürst (Hrsg.): Dialog als Selbstvollzug der Kirche (= Quaestiones disputatae, Bd. 166). Herder, Freiburg 1997, S. 309–328.
- mit Marianne Heimbach-Steins: Frauen-Menschen-Rechte. Universalität und Partikularität von Frauenrechten am Beispiel des Rechtes auf Entwicklung. In: Jahrbuch für Christliche Sozialwissenschaften, Jg. 39 (1998), S. 161–188.
- Weltweite Bildung und soziale Ungleichheit – Kommentar zum Beitrag von Klaus Seitz. In: Marianne Heimbach-Steins, Gerhard Kruip (Hrsg.): Bildung und Beteiligungsgerechtigkeit. Sozialethische Sondierungen. Bielefeld 2003, S. 97–107.
- Begabungen fördern. Was heißt Chancengerechtigkeit im Bildungswesen? In: Herder Korrespondenz, Jg. 64 (2010), S. 312–316.
