= Walter Homolka =

German rabbi (born 1964)

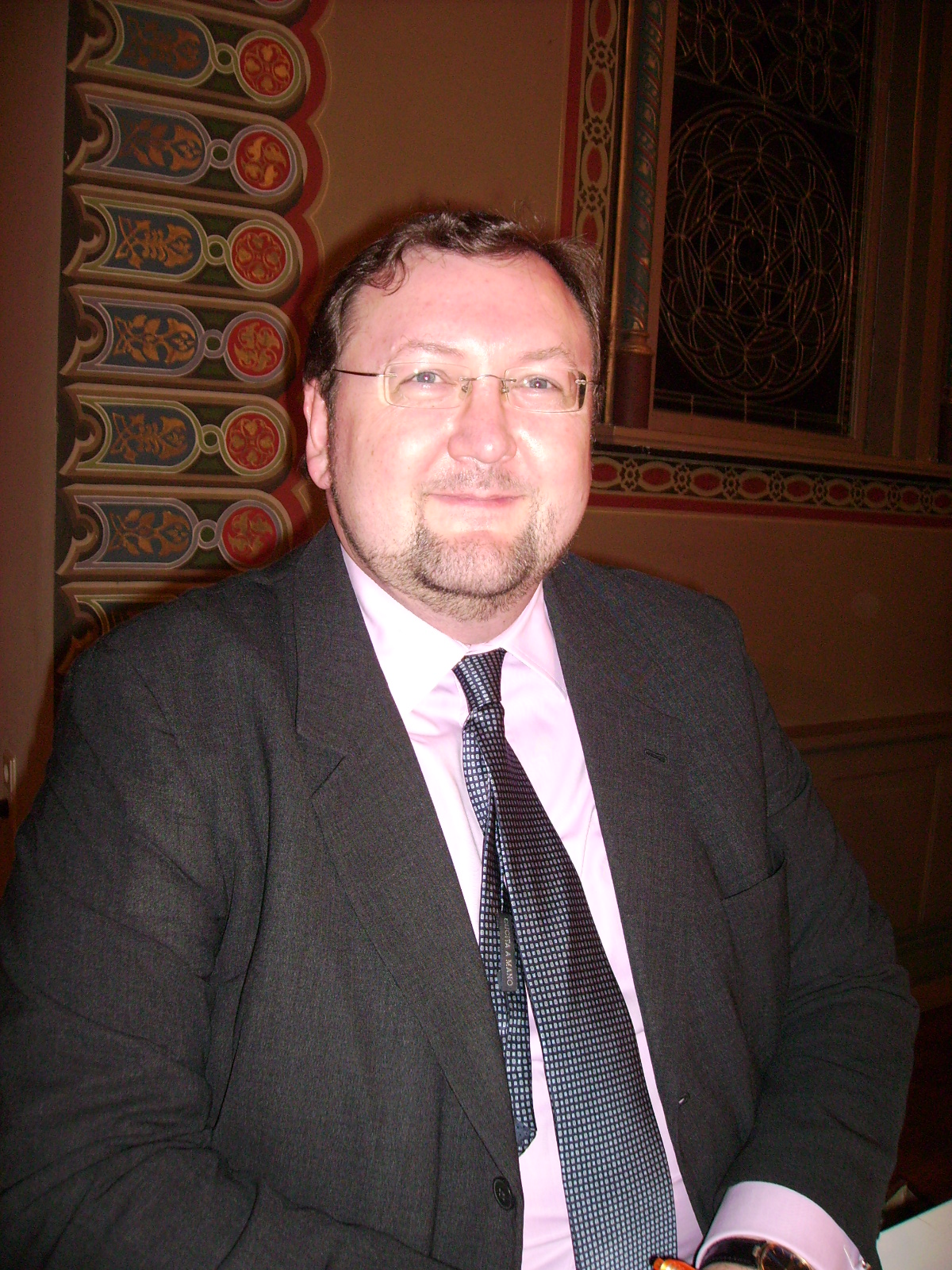
Rabbi Walter Homolka in 2009

Walter Homolka (born 21 May 1964, Landau an der Isar) is a German rabbi.

A convert to Judaism, Homolka studied at LMU Munich, the King's College London, University of Wales, Lampeter, and Leipzig University, and has a PhD from King's College London. Homolka amended his PhD-thesis in 2026 at the request of King's College after the university confirmed the academic integrity of the dissertation in reaction to plagiarism allegations in German media.

He is an adjunct full professor at the University of Potsdam and rector at its Abraham Geiger College, which was founded in 1999.

On 14 September 2006, Homolka ordained the first three rabbis in Germany since the Holocaust at the New Synagogue of Dresden. Homolka is chairman of the Leo Baeck Foundation and an executive board member of the World Union for Progressive Judaism. In 2007, he established the Jewish Institute of Cantorial Arts, of which he is the president. A member of the French Legion of Honour, he is widely published internationally and holds a variety of distinctions. The Hebrew Union College - Jewish Institute of Religion conferred upon him a "Doctor Humanarum Litterarum" honoris causa.

Homolka is active in Jewish-Christian dialogue as a guest at the Central Committee of German Catholics. In 2008, he condemned the new Good Friday Prayer instituted by Pope Benedict XVI.

In May 2022, the German newspaper Die Welt reported allegations of sexual misconduct against Homolka and his husband, including inappropriate behavior toward students at the Abraham Geiger College. Homolka subsequently announced that he would temporarily step down from all his roles.

An investigative commission appointed by the University of Potsdam published its findings in October 2022. The commission did not substantiate claims that he had engaged in or tolerated sexually harassement and found no basis for criminal, civil, or disciplinary proceedings against Homolka. It found evidence for an abuse of power by Homolka through the accumulation of offices, the creation of problematic study and employment conditions, and interference in academic careers. It recommended that Homolka's management functions be unbundled, that independent oversight bodies be established, and that the rules of procedure be reviewed.

In June 2024, Homolka and the Axel Springer publishing house (owner of Die Welt and Bild) reached a settlement before the Kammergericht Berlin, concluding a legal dispute that had lasted nearly two years. Homolka had taken legal action against various allegations published by Springer outlets. As part of the settlement, both parties agreed that comprehensive investigations by the University of Potsdam and by the law firm Gercke Wollschläger on behalf of the Central Council of Jews in Germany had not established any criminal or disciplinary misconduct.

== Honours and awards ==
- Grand Decoration of Honour in Silver for Services to the Republic of Austria (2006)
- Muhammad-Nafi-Cheleby Award (2011)
- Knight of the Legion of Honour (France)
- Austrian Cross of Honour for Science and Art (2001)
- Gold Decoration of the Province of Salzburg
- Gold Decoration for Services to the Province of Lower Austria
- Silver Medal of the City of Vienna
- Knight of the Order of Merit of the Italian Republic
- International Honorary Citizen of New Orleans
- Bundeswehr Cross of Honour in Gold
- Officer of the German Federal Merit Order
- Order of Merit of Berlin
- Order of Merit of Brandenburg
