= Evelyn Hecht-Galinski =

Evelyn Hecht-Galinski (born 1949, in Berlin) is a German activist, an outspoken critic of Israel's policies towards Palestinians and a member of the group European Jews for a Just Peace. She is a daughter of Heinz Galinski, a former president of the Central Council of Jews in Germany.

In a highly publicized interview with German radio, Hecht-Galinski described the Central Council as the "mouthpiece of the Israeli government in Germany," criticized "Israel's criminal actions," and equated Israeli policies with those of Nazi Germany.

The German journalist Henryk Broder wrote a letter to the radio program criticizing Ms. Hecht-Galinski, saying: "Her specialty is intellectually vapid anti-semitic anti-Zionist phrases—such as are currently in fashion." Following the publication of Broder's letter on the blog Achse des Guten (The Axis of Good), Hecht-Galinski sued for libel of her description as being "anti-Semitic". In September 2008 the Landgericht Köln ruled that he must not repeat this statement, a decision which Broder successfully appealed. In June 2009, the regional court in Cologne dismissed her defamation suit.
