= Dieter Graumann =

German jurist

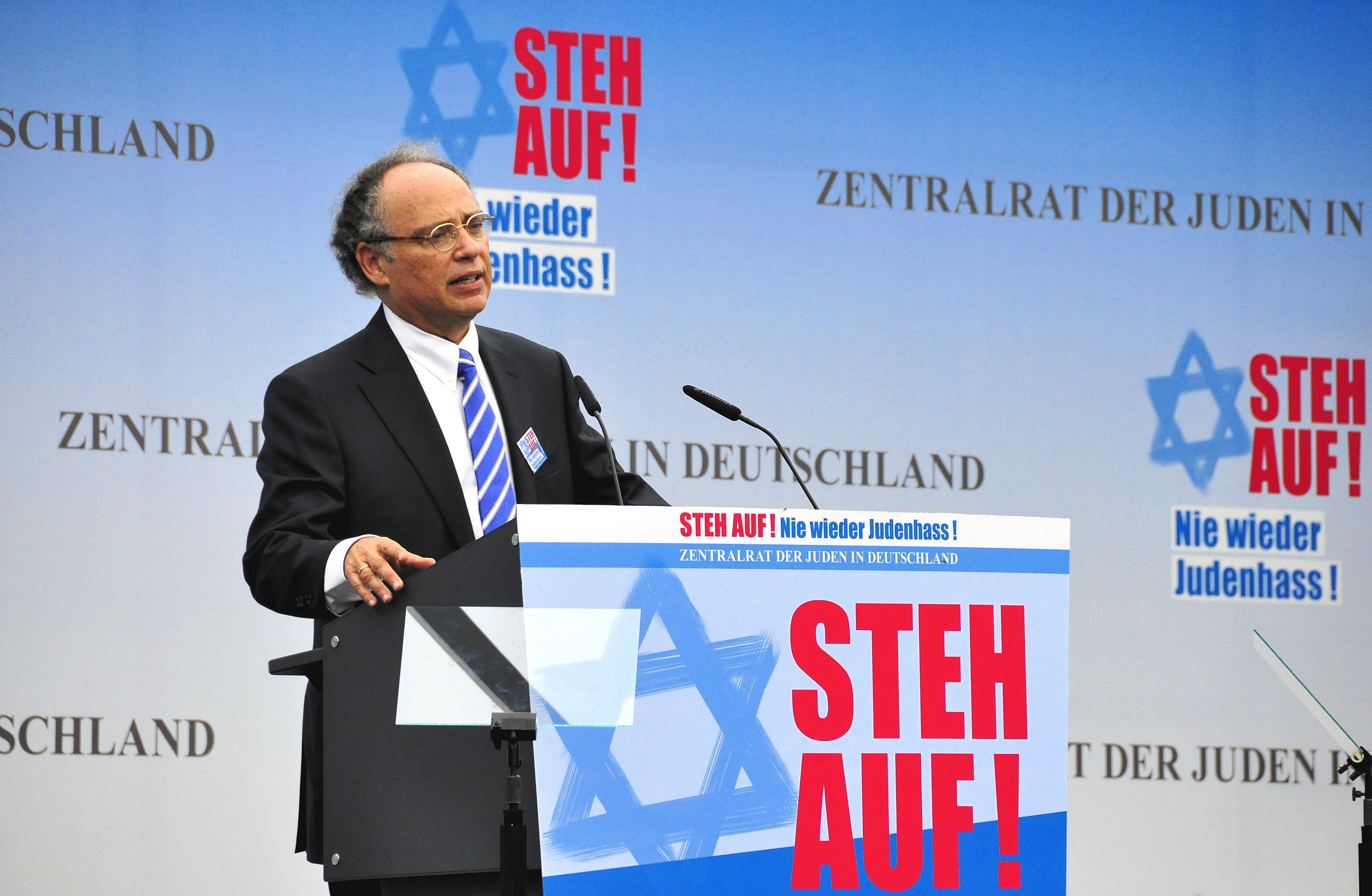
Dieter Graumann speaks on a rally against anti-Semitism in Berlin, September 2014

Dieter Graumann (born 20 August 1950 in Ramat Gan as David Graumann) is an Israeli/German jurist and economist. From 28 November 2010 to 30 November 2014, he was President of the Central Council of Jews in Germany and has been Vice President of the World Jewish Congress since 6 May 2013. He succeeded Charlotte Knobloch in both positions.

== Life ==
David Graumann was born in 1950 in Ramat Gan, Israel, the son of Polish Holocaust survivors. His parents met at a concentration camp in Zeilsheim, Germany. His parents immigrated to Germany with him when he was only one year old, settling in Frankfurt am Main. Soon after their transplant, his name was changed to Dieter, an attempt to conceal his Jewish identity in post-war Germany.

After completing his Abitur, Graumann studied economics at the University of Frankfurt and law at King's College London, completing his doctoral thesis on the European Economic Community in 1979. Following his graduation, he worked at the Deutsche Bundesbank for two years, also serving as President of Makkabi Frankfurt, an organization of which he is now honorary president.

Before his presidency of the Central Council of Jews in Germany, Graumann's work revolved around his private Assets Management practice, along with participation in various German Jewish organizations in his hometown of Frankfurt.

In 2009, Graumann announced his candidacy for the Presidency of the Central Council of Jews in Germany, a position which he won. He was the first president of the council who did not personally survive the Holocaust.

== Presidency of the Central Council of Jews in Germany ==
During the UEFA Euro 2012 Poland/Ukraine, Graumann implored the German National Team to visit Auschwitz or Babi Yar. The German Team did visit Auschwitz, however, Graumann criticized the small team delegation of three players and comments regarding the visit by Team Manager Oliver Bierhoff.

In 2012, Graumann heavily criticized the decision of a Cologne court to label circumcision as genital mutilation, labeling the decision religiously insensitive and "cold".

Also in 2012, Graumann published a book, Nachgeboren – Vorbelastet? Die Zukunft des Judentums in Deutschland, concerning Jewish life in Germany, specifically analyzing what he saw as new threats to German Jewry from leftist anti-Zionists and Islamism.

In 2013, Graumann heavily criticized the official response to an antisemitic attack by a youth on an Offenbach Rabbi in a mall.

In 2014, Graumann's statements connecting European antisemitism to Israel-Hamas violence and comparing antisemitism in pro-Palestinian organizations to the Holocaust garnered some criticism as trivialization of the Holocaust.

On 31 October 2014, Graumann announced that he would not seek another term as President of the Central Council.

Cultural offices
Preceded by Charlotte Knobloch	President of the Central Council of Jews in Germany; 2010–2014	Succeeded by Josef Schuster
