= Josef Schuster =

German physician

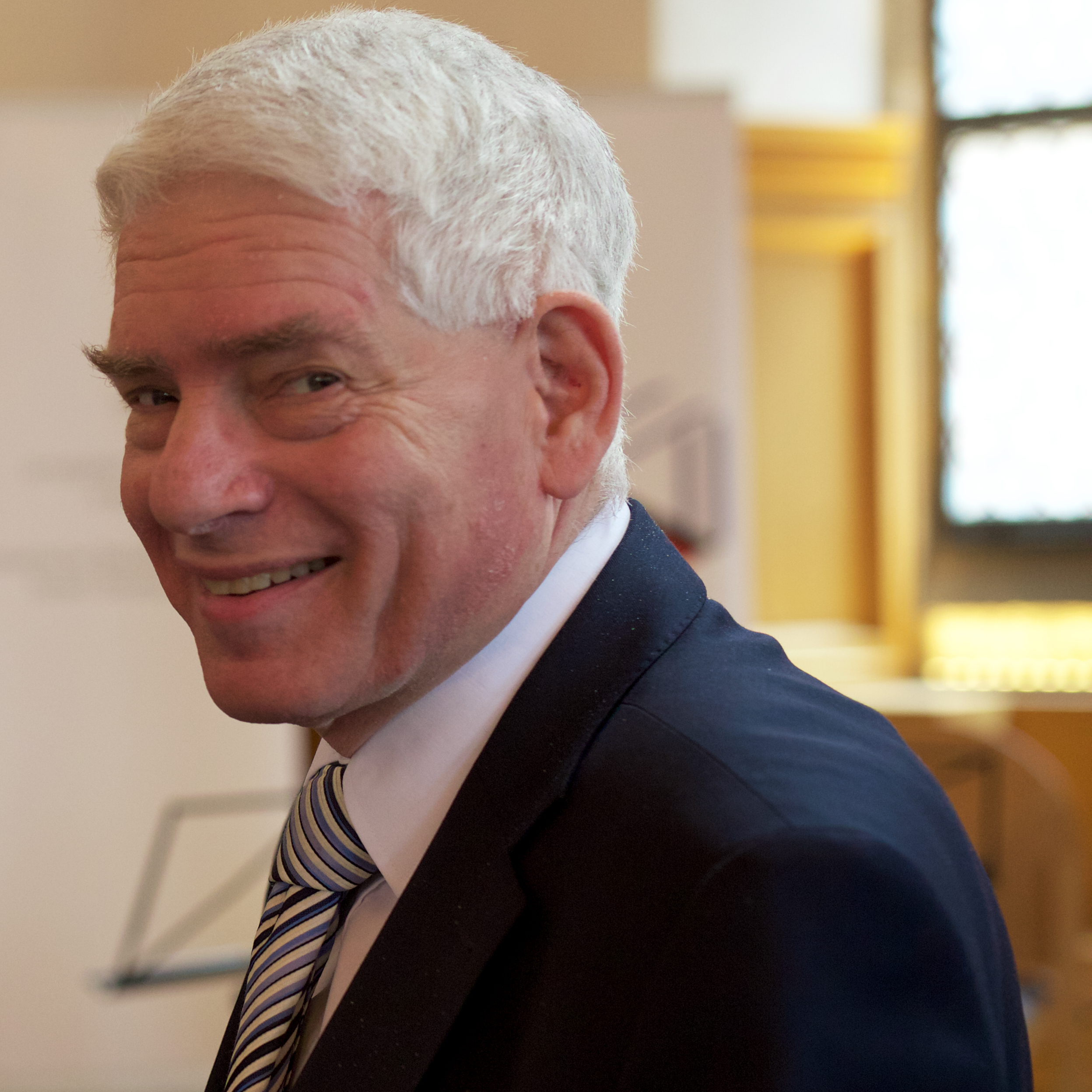
Schuster in 2015

Josef Schuster (Hebrew: יוסף שוסטר; born 20 March 1954) is a German physician and since November 2014 President of the Central Council of Jews in Germany (Zentralrat der Juden in Deutschland).

== Biography ==
Schuster's paternal family had lived in Franconia in Germany since at least the middle of the 16th century. He is the son of the merchant and association official David Schuster. David and his father, the merchant Julius Schuster, operated the Central Hotel in Bad Brückenau. In 1933, the hotel was confiscated by the local Nazi Party (NSDAP).

In 1937, Julius and David were arrested and imprisoned in the Dachau and Buchenwald concentration camps. They were later released on the condition that they leave Germany, allowing their property to be transferred into Nazi ownership in a formally "legal" manner. The two emigrated to Mandatory Palestine, where David worked for a construction company.

Josef Schuster’s mother, Anita Susanna Grünpeter, was born on 14 November 1914 in Laurahütte, Upper Silesia. Her mother, Hedwig Kosderlitz, born on 26 June 1884, and her father, Fritz Grünpeter, born on 18 October 1876, lived in Gleiwitz until 1942 and were murdered in the Auschwitz concentration camp.

Anita Susanna Grünpeter and David Schuster married in 1953. Josef Schuster was born in Haifa, Israel in 1954 and the family returned to Germany in 1956. Schuster went to school in Würzburg and studied medicine at the Julius-Maximilians-Universität Würzburg. He became a specialist in internal medicine after training at the Juliusspital. Since 1988, he has maintained a private practice in internal medicine in Würzburg.

Schuster is a volunteer, acting as an emergency physician for the Bavarian section of the German Red Cross. He is a member of the Bavarian Bioethics Commission and the central institutional review board of the German Medical Association.

== Jewish organizational leadership ==
In 1998, Schuster became President of the Jewish Community in Würzburg, a position his father had held between 1958 and 1996. Four years later, he was elected to be President of the Organization of Jewish Communities in Bavaria. In 2010, he became the vice-president of the Central Council of Jews in Germany. When Dieter Graumann stepped down as President of the Council, Schuster was elected as his successor on 30 November 2014.

On 21 May 2026, German prosecutors charged a Danish national and an Afghan national with involvement in an alleged Iran-linked plot to assassinate Schuster and Volker Beck, president of the German-Israeli Society, in Germany. According to authorities, the Danish man carried out surveillance of potential targets, while the Afghan allegedly tried to procure a weapon in a case that is believed to be linked to the IRGC.

== Other activities ==
- University of Würzburg, Member of the Board of Trustees
- German Coordinating-Council for Christian-Jewish Cooperation Organizations, Member of the Board of Trustees
- Deutsche Nationalstiftung, Member of the Senate

== Writings ==
- Zur Sterblichkeit jüdischer und nichtjüdischer Säuglinge. Dissertation Würzburg, University, 1980. OCLC 720698054

== Literature ==
- Caroline Mayer: "Ich wünsche mir Normalität für die jüdischen Gemeinden in Deutschland", KVB-Forum, Nr. 11, 2012, S. 26-27, Online (2 pages, in German pdf)

Cultural offices
Preceded by Dieter Graumann	President of the Central Council of Jews in Germany; 2014–	Succeeded by Incumbent
