= Maccabi R.F.C. =

Australian rugby union club, based in Clovelly, NSW

Maccabi Rugby
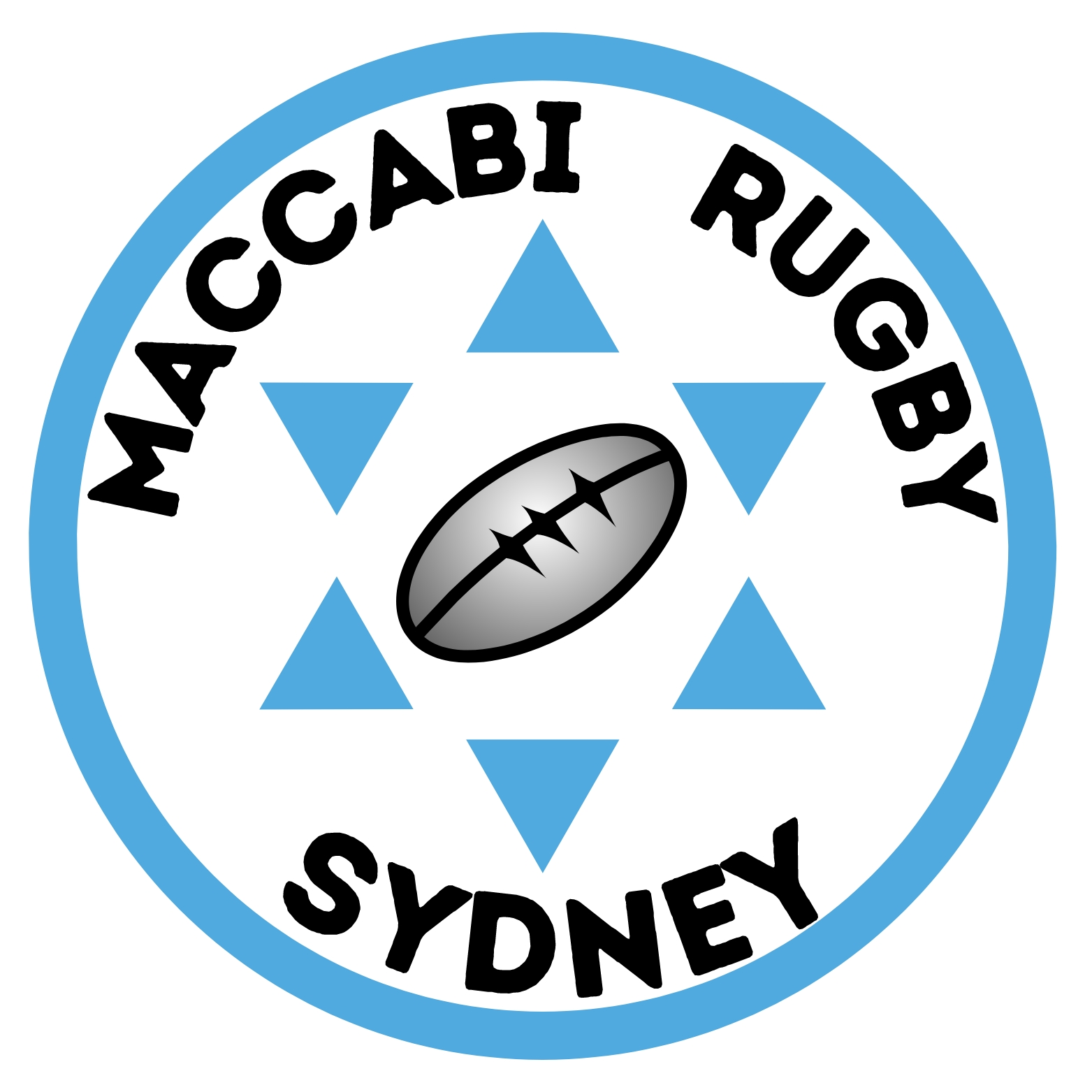
- Full name: Maccabi Rugby Football Club
- Founded: 1969; 57 years ago as "Ilan"
- Location: Clovelly, New South Wales, Sydney, Australia
- Ground(s): Burrows Park, Clovelly
- League: NSWSRU
- 1st
Team kit

Maccabi Rugby Football Club is an amateur rugby union club that plays in the New South Wales Suburban Rugby Union.

== History ==
Founded in 1969, the club participated in sub-district Premierships winning in 1973 and 1977. After an almost twenty-year hiatus, the club was reformed in 2006 to provide the Australian Jewish community with its own club and strengthen their squads for the Maccabiah Games in Israel.

With the majority of the club having come back from winning the gold medal at the 2009 Maccabiah Games, the club was able to secure the 2009 Meldrum Cup.

== Honours ==
- Meldrum Cup (1st Grade): 2009

== See also ==
- History of the Jews in Australia
