= Maccabi Düsseldorf =

German football club

TuS Maccabi Düsseldorf
- Full name: TuS Maccabi e.V. Düsseldorf
- Founded: 1923
- Manager: Vladimir Ponukarin
- League: Niederrhein, Kreis Düsseldorf, Kreisliga C
Home colours	Away colours

Maccabi Düsseldorf was a German association football club based in the city of Düsseldorf, North Rhine-Westphalia.

== History ==
The club was founded in 1923.

The rise to power in Germany of the Nazis in the early 30s led to discrimination against Jews and by 1933 Jewish teams were excluded from general competition and limited to play in separate leagues or tournaments. In 1938 Jewish teams were banned outright as discrimination turned to persecution.

In the aftermath of World War II Jewish sports and cultural associations eventually re-emerged in Germany with Maccabi Düsseldorf leading the way with its re-establishment in 1965. Through the 70s and 80s the club grew to include departments for basketball, gymnastics, and table tennis.

At the season 2023/24, the club was playing in Kresiliga C.
