= Ernst Ehrlich =

German philosopher (1921–2007)

Ernst Ludwig Ehrlich
- Born: 27 March 1921
- Died: 21 October 2007 (aged 86); Riehen, Switzerland

Philosophical work
- Era: 20th-century philosophy
- Region: Jewish philosophy
- Institutions: European director of B'nai B'rith
- Main interests: Religious philosophy, interfaith dialogue
- Notable works: Advisor for "Nostra aetate"

Ernst Ludwig Ehrlich (27 March 1921 – 21 October 2007) was a Swiss Jewish religious philosopher.

== Biography ==
Born 27 March 1921, Ehrlich fled Nazi Germany for Switzerland in June 1943, using a false passport. From 1961 to 1994, he was European director of the Jewish organisation B'nai B'rith.

He was an adviser to German Cardinal Augustin Bea at the Second Vatican Council in preparing "Nostra aetate", a key document on Roman Catholic-Jewish relations.

He died at his home in Riehen, a suburb of Basel.

== Translations of works to English ==
- A concise history of Israel from the earliest times to the destruction of the temple in A. D. 70. Translated by James Barr (1962)

== Sources ==
- Obituary in The Times, 29 October 2007
