= Paul Spiegel =

German politician (1937–2006)

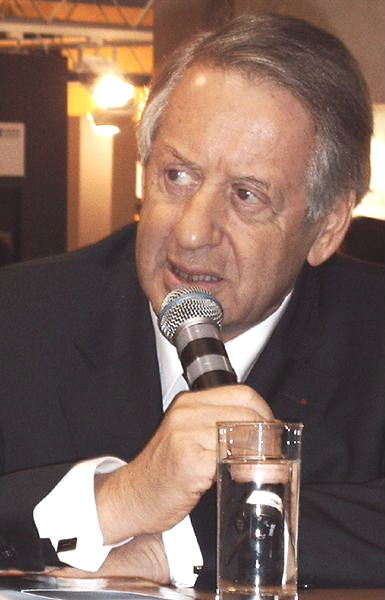
Paul Spiegel

Paul Spiegel (31 December 1937, in Warendorf, Germany – 30 April 2006, in Düsseldorf, Germany) was leader of the Central Council of Jews in Germany (Zentralrat der Juden in Deutschland) and the main spokesman of the German Jews. He was widely praised for his leadership of the German Jewish community, which had grown from the remnants left by the Nazis into the third largest Jewish community in western Europe.

== Early life ==
Paul Spiegel was born into a Westphalian family of cattle dealers, originating from the small town Versmold. After the Nazi rise to power, the family fled at first to Brussels. Spiegel survived the Holocaust in Flanders where he was hidden by a family of farmers. Prior to that, his sister Rosa had been arrested during a police raid in Brussels; she was later killed in Bergen-Belsen. His father was arrested and held in Buchenwald, Auschwitz, and Dachau, but survived to reunite with Spiegel and his mother in Warendorf after the war. Spiegel described these events in his book At home again? (Wieder zu Hause?).

Siegel was the nephew of Siegmund, a cattle and horse trader, and Marga Spiegel, both of whom survived the Holocaust with the help of farmers and their families. Marga wrote the memoir Saviors in the Night, which was made into a film.

== Journalist ==
In 1958, he began practical training as a journalist with the Allgemeine Jüdische Wochenzeitung, now the Jüdische Allgemeine, in Düsseldorf. He was also active as an editor at this newspaper until 1965, when he became editor of the Jewish Press Service and assistant to the secretary-general of the Zentralrat der Juden. During the 1960s he worked for various other newspapers as well.

== Zentralrat der Juden ==
In 1993 he became a member of the executive committee of the Zentralrat der Juden, first as vice president and later (as of 9 January 2000, following the death of Ignatz Bubis) as president. On 11 February 2004, Paul Spiegel received an honorary doctorate from the Heinrich Heine University in Düsseldorf, and was made an honorary citizen of Warendorf, the city of his birth. Since 1986 he ran an agency for artists and media in Düsseldorf.

=== Equal status for Jewish community in Germany ===
On the 58th anniversary of the liberation of Auschwitz in 2003, Spiegel and Chancellor Gerhard Schröder signed an agreement that granted Germany's Jewish community the same legal status as the country's Christian religions, thereby tripling annual government funding of the Zentralrat der Juden to $3.8 million.

=== Outspoken as leader ===
Spiegel was an outspoken critic of lawyers who took what he felt were overly large fees to represent Jews who had been slave laborers during World War II, saying "Earning money should not come before moralistic intentions." He also criticized the national Holocaust Memorial in Berlin, stating at its dedication in 2005 that it failed to address the basic question, "Why were members of a civilized people in the heart of Europe capable of planning and carrying out mass murder?"

== Death ==
Paul Spiegel died in the morning hours of 30 April 2006, in Düsseldorf, after suffering from cancer. He is survived by his wife, Gisèle Spatz, whom he married in 1964, and their two daughters.

== Bibliography of Paul Spiegel ==
- Wieder zu Hause?, Ullstein Verlag München 2003, ISBN 3-548-36395-4
- Was ist koscher?, Ullstein Verlag München 2003, ISBN 3-548-36713-5
- Gespräch über Deutschland. Interview with Wilfried Köpke Herder, Freiburg, 2006, ISBN 3-451-29292-0
- Shavua Tov! Eine gute Woche! Jüdische Türme aus Schwäbisch Gmünd., Stadt Schwäbisch Gmünd, 2001, ISBN 3-9807297-3-7

Preceded by Ignatz Bubis	President of the Central Council of Jews in Germany; 2000–2006	Succeeded by Charlotte Knobloch
