= Jan Mühlstein =

Journalist and German Jewish activist (born 1949)

Jan Mühlstein (born 3 July 1949) is a journalist, German Jewish activist and the former chair of the Union of Progressive Jews in Germany.

== Life ==
Jan Mühlstein was born on 3 July 1949 in Most, Czechoslovakia. He grew up in a German-speaking Jewish family, which traditionally practised Liberal Judaism. In 1967, he began studying physics at the Charles University in Prague. After the defeat of the reformation movement known as the Prague Spring, in which Mühlstein participated actively, he immigrated to West Germany in 1969. From 1970 onwards, he studied physics at LMU Munich and completed a Ph.D. in theoretical quantum optics in 1977. During the next four years, he worked in the leadership of project energy research of the nuclear energy research facility in Jülich. Since 1982, Mühlstein has been working as a business journalist in Munich and is deputy chief editor of a journal covering the economics of the energy market.

Between 1977 and 1978, Mühlstein was a board member of the West German section of Amnesty International. He is a co-founder of the Liberal Jewish Community Munich "Beth Shalom", whose chair he was until 2005. He was again elected as chair of Beth Shalom in May 2011. From 1999 until 2011, he was the chair of the Union of Progressive Jews in Germany. Mühlstein is particularly committed to promote religious plurality in Judaism.

Mühlstein is married to Dr. Verena Mühlstein (born 1953), author of a biography about Albert Schweitzer's wife, Helene Bresslau, who is also active at Beth Shalom. One of his three daughters works as a rabbi at the Liberal Synagogue "The Ark" in Northwood and Pinner.
