= Charlotte Knobloch =

Former president of the Central Council of Jews in Germany

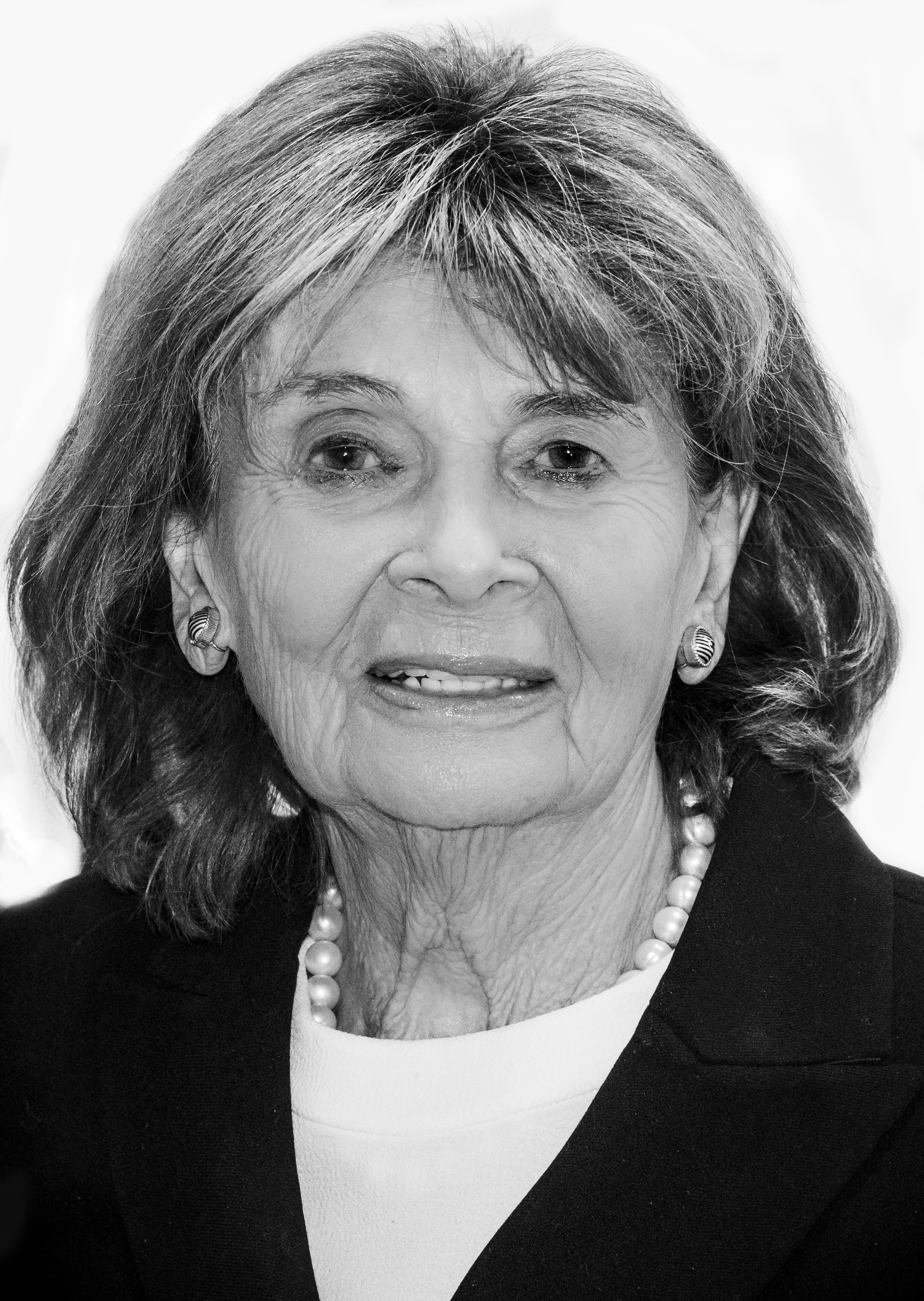
Knobloch in 2019

Charlotte Knobloch (née Neuland; born 29 October 1932) is the former President of Central Council of Jews in Germany (Zentralrat der Juden in Deutschland) from 2006 to 2010. She is also Vice President of the European Jewish Congress and the World Jewish Congress. She has for many years been one of the primary leaders of the Jewish community in Munich, as President of the Israelitische Kultusgemeinde München und Oberbayern since 1985.

== Biography ==
Charlotte Knobloch was born in Munich, in 1932, into a well-to-do Jewish family of lawyers. She is the daughter of Munich lawyer and Bavarian senator Fritz Neuland. Her mother Margarethe was a born Christian, but converted to Judaism upon marrying Neuland. However, her parents divorced in 1936. She was subsequently raised by her grandmother Albertine Neuland. Upon the arrest of her father, Knobloch was saved by the former housekeeper of the Neuland family, who took her in her hand and brought her to her Christian family in Franconia, pretending she was her own illegitimate daughter.

Charlotte Neuland married Samuel Knobloch in 1951, and has three children.

One of her achievements is the Jewish Centre (Jüdisches Zentrum) in Munich, with a new principal Ohel Jakob synagogue and a Jewish museum. She was made an honorary citizen of Munich in 2005.

Knobloch is especially concerned with the problem of antisemitism in Eastern Europe. In the World Jewish Congress, she works to promote the German-speaking Jewish communities and to build bridges to Jewish communities in other countries. She took a controversial stand against the Stolpersteine in Munich, stumbling blocks on pavement inscribed with the name and life dates of victims of Nazi extermination or persecution, effectively blocking their collocation on public grounds until today.

In January 2009, she claimed that the Central Council was temporarily breaking off contact with the Roman Catholic Church because of the lifting of the excommunication of controversial bishop Richard Williamson.

== Selected other activities ==
- Deutsches Museum, Member of the Board of Trustees
- German Friends of the Hebrew University, Member of the Board of Trustees
- Gegen Vergessen – Für Demokratie, Member of the Board
- Konrad Adenauer Foundation (KAS), Member of the Board of Trustees
- LMU Munich, Member of the Board of Trustees
- Ernst Ludwig Ehrlich Scholarship Fund, Patron

== Recognition ==
In 2008 Knobloch was awarded the Great Cross of Merit with Star of the Order of Merit of the Federal Republic of Germany.

In January 2014, Knobloch was honored as the first Distinguished Service Awardee by the Obermayer German Jewish History Awards.

== In media ==
The book Charlotte Knobloch – Ein Portrait by Michael Schleicher was published in 2009, ISBN 978-3-937090-32-0. The TV film Annas Heimkehr is based on Charlotte Knobloch's life during World War II.

Cultural offices
| Preceded by Paul Spiegel | President of the Central Council of Jews in Germany; 2006–2010 | Succeeded by Dieter Graumann |
