= Central Council of Jews in Germany =

Federation of German Jews

Logo

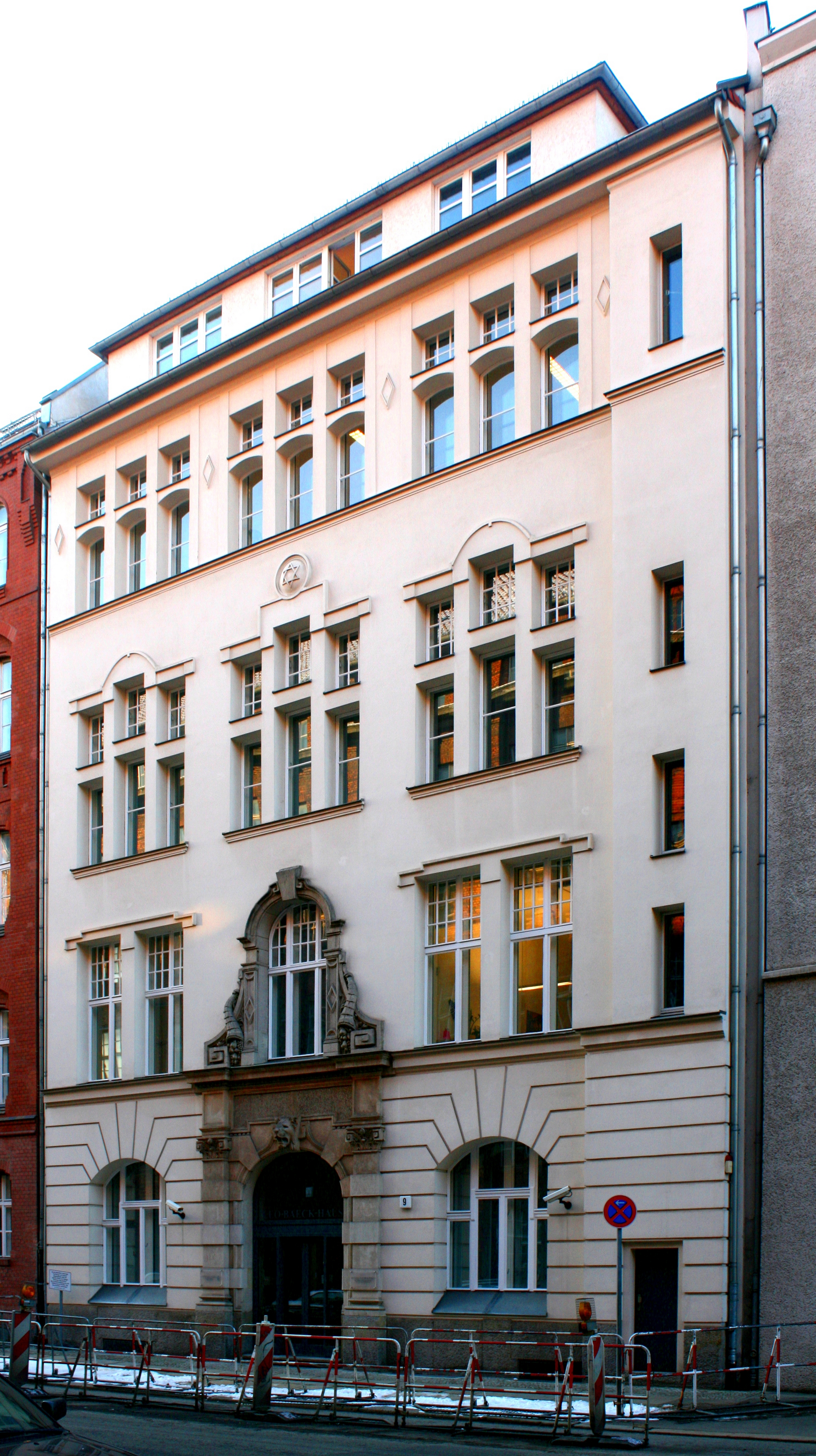
The Leo-Baeck-Haus in Berlin: Headquarters of the Zentralrat der Juden in Deutschland

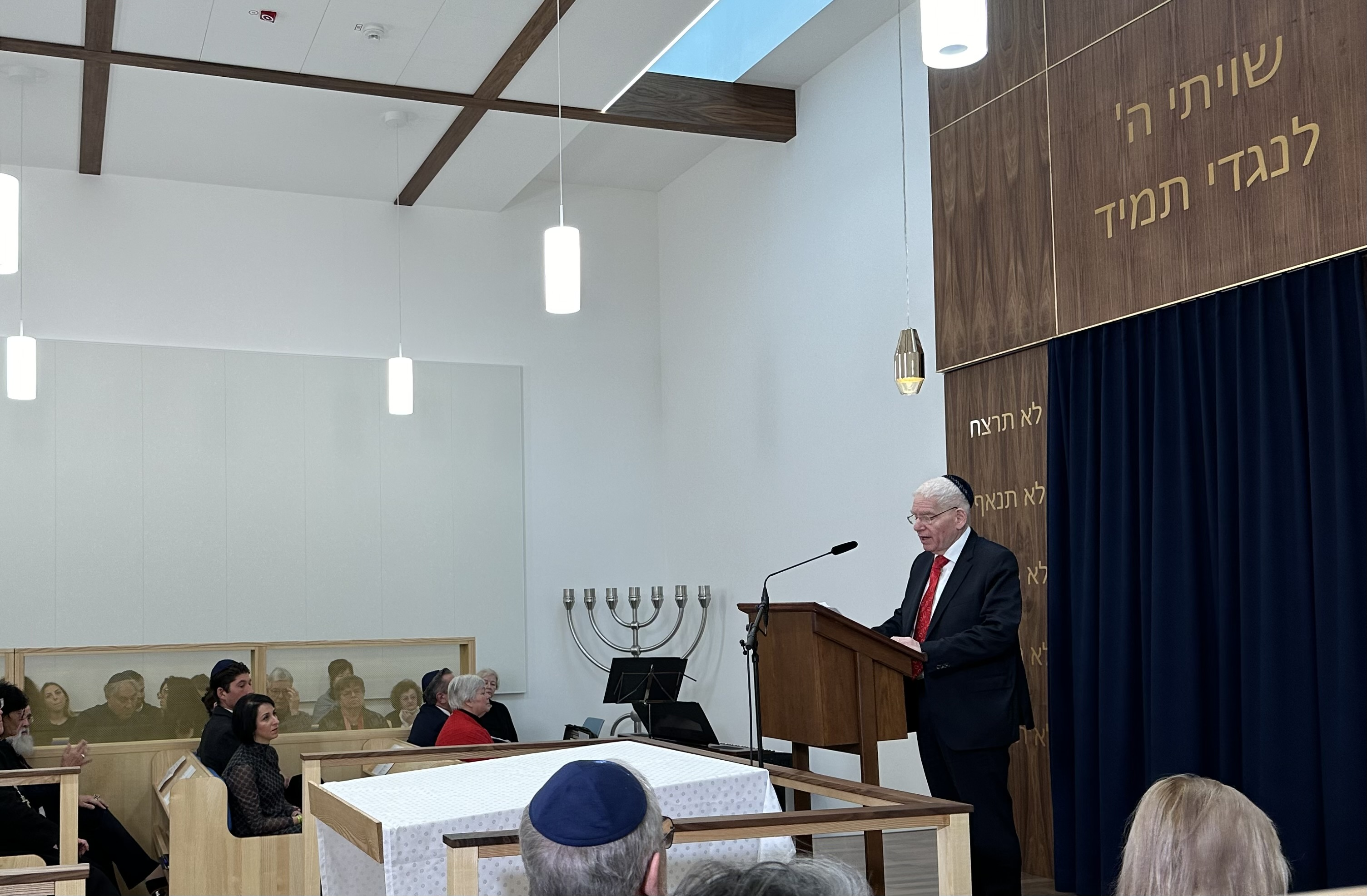
President Josef Schuster at the opening of the New Synagogue, Magdeburg

The Central Council of Jews in Germany (German: Zentralrat der Juden in Deutschland) is a federation of German Jews. It was founded on 19 July 1950, as a response to the increasing isolation of German Jews by the international Jewish community and increasing interest in Jewish affairs by the (West) German government. Originally based in the Rhenish areas (Düsseldorf and Bonn), it transferred its seat to Berlin after the Reunification of Germany (1990). As of 2015 the Jewish community in Germany has around 100,000 registered members. The Zentralrat is the German affiliate of the World Jewish Congress (WJC).

== History ==
In its early years, its leadership was composed of native German Jews (Yekkes), while most of the Jewish community in Germany was made up of Polish-born Jewish Holocaust survivors who had come to Germany as displaced persons, fleeing from the sporadically anti-Zionist and antisemitic communist regime of Poland. Thus, the organisation called itself "Central Council of Jews in Germany" rather than "Central Council of German Jews." Over time, the Polish-born Jews or their children acculturated to German society and became leaders of the Jewish community. By the late 1980s, the organisation considered changing its name. Since the collapse of the communist regimes of eastern Europe, Germany has experienced a great influx of Russian Jews and other Jews from the former Soviet Union (that collapsed in 1991). Although most of the Jews now living in Germany are recent immigrants, the organisation is dominated by the so-called "German" Jews (who themselves are primarily descended from the Eastern European immigrants of the immediate postwar years).

The organization has faced a corruption scandal involving financial irregularities under the administration of Werner Nachmann (president 1969 until 1988). After Nachmann's death (January 1988), Heinz Galinski (1912–1992), the chairman of the West Berlin Jewish community for 43 years, assumed the leadership of the Central Council and brought it stability and respectability. Under Ignatz Bubis (1927–1999), the Central Council assumed a much greater profile in German public life, and the Jewish community's leadership felt increasingly confident weighing in on public debates concerning Holocaust memory and German identity.

In more recent years, the division between more observant and more liberal Jews has strained the organisation, which remains (or claims to be) the sole representative body of the Jewish community in Germany and which generally supports strict observance. In April 2004, open controversy erupted between the leader of the Central Council, Paul Spiegel (1937–2006), and the leader of the more liberal organisation Union of Progressive Jews in Germany, Jan Mühlstein (born 1949). The latter demanded equal financial support from the government for his organisation.

In 2009, the Central Council criticised the Vatican over its decision to lift the excommunication on the bishops of the Society of Saint Pius X. It later boycotted a ceremony in the Berlin parliament which commemorated victims of the Holocaust, saying its leaders had been treated without the proper respect in previous years.

== Chairpersons/Presidents ==
- 1954–1963: Heinz Galinski
- 1963–1969: Herbert Lewin
- 1969–1988: Werner Nachmann
- 1988–1992: Heinz Galinski
- 1992–1999: Ignatz Bubis
- 2000–2006: Paul Spiegel
- 2006–2010: Charlotte Knobloch
- 2010–2014: Dieter Graumann
- 2014–present: Josef Schuster

== Secretaries-general ==
- 1950–1973: Hendrik George van Dam
- 1973–1988: Alexander Ginsburg
- 1988–1992: Micha Guttmann
- 2004-2014: Stephan J. Kramer

== See also ==
- Central Council of Muslims in Germany (German name: Zentralrat der Muslime in Deutschland)
- Deutsch-Israelitischer Gemeindebund
