= Timeline of women hazzans =

This is a timeline of women hazzans (also called cantors) worldwide.

- 1884: Julie Rosewald, called "Cantor Soprano" by her congregation, became America's first female cantor, serving San Francisco's Temple Emanu-El from 1884 until 1893, although she was not ordained. She was born in Germany.
- 1955: Betty Robbins, born in Greece, became the first female cantor to serve in the twentieth century in America (although she was not ordained) when she was hired at Temple Avodah in Oceanside, New York.
- Mid-1950s: Esther Ghan Firestone became the first female cantor in Canada, although she was not ordained.
- 1975: Barbara Ostfeld-Horowitz became the first ordained female cantor in Jewish history.
- 1978: Mindy Jacobsen became the first blind woman to be ordained as a cantor.
- 1978: Linda Rich became the first female cantor to sing in a Conservative synagogue (specifically Temple Beth Zion in Los Angeles) in 1978, although she was not ordained until 1996 when she finally received her ordination of "Hazzan Minister" from the "Jewish Theological Seminary" in New York.
- 1987: Erica Lippitz and Marla Rosenfeld Barugel became the first female cantors in Conservative Judaism.
- 1982: Women Cantors Network, an international outreach support group for female cantors, which works for the nationwide recognition and employment of qualified female cantors, was founded in 1982 by cantor Deborah Katchko-Zimmerman, who was the granddaughter of a prominent cantor (Adolph Katchko), and who was trained privately by her father, also a cantor.
- 1990: The Cantors Assembly, an international professional organization of cantors associated with Conservative Judaism, began allowing women to join.
- 1991: Vicki L. Axe became the first woman to serve as president of the American Conference of Cantors, which she did from 1991-1994.
- 1993: Leslie Friedlander became the first female cantor ordained by the Academy for Jewish Religion (New York).
- 1998: Rebecca Garfein, born in Tallahassee, Florida, became the first female cantor to preside in a German synagogue.

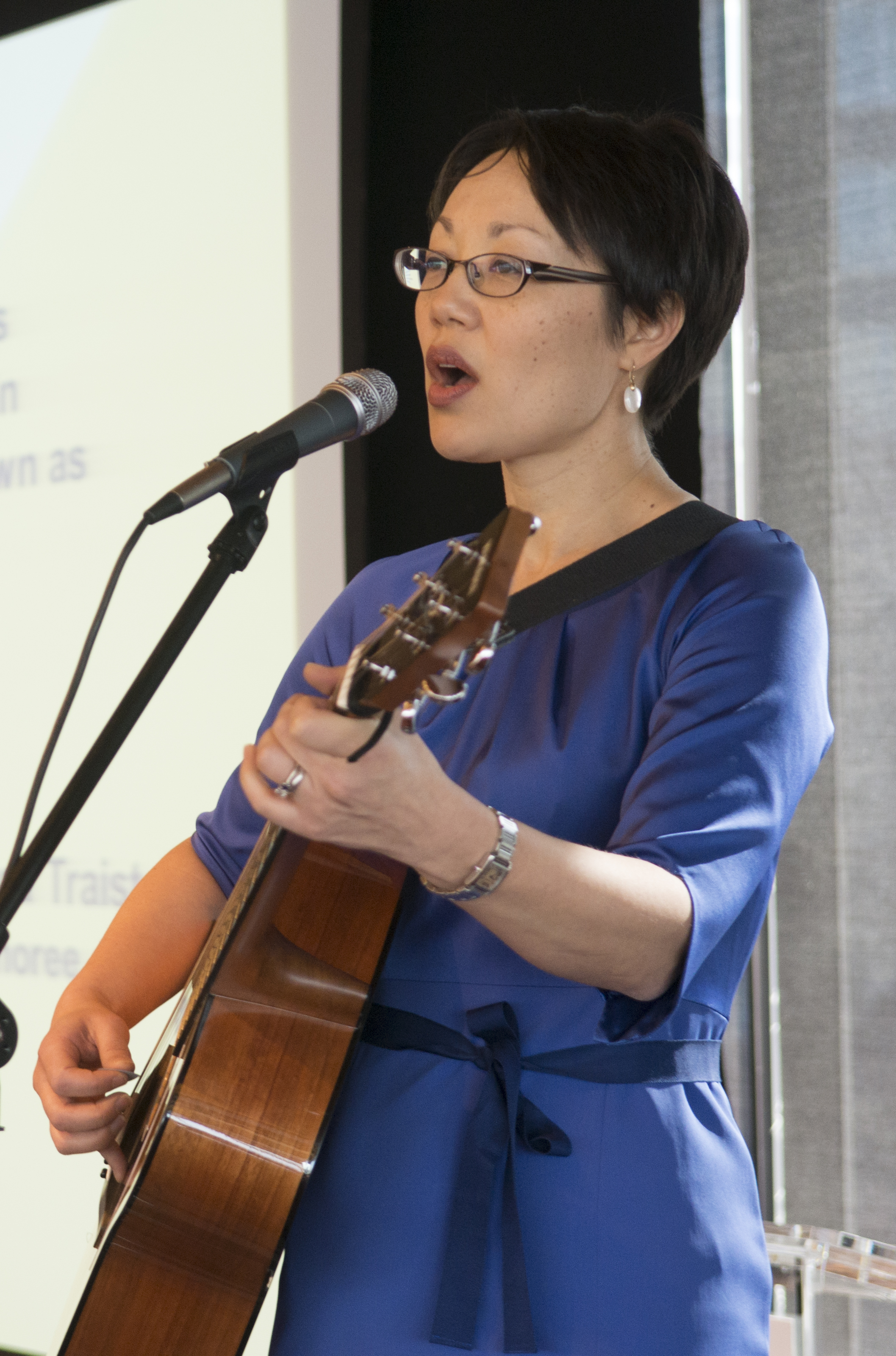
Hazzan and rabbi Angela Warnick Buchdahl

- 1999: Angela Warnick Buchdahl, born in South Korea, became the first Asian-American person to be ordained as a cantor.
- 2001: Deborah Davis became the first cantor of either sex (and therefore, since she was female, the first female cantor) in Humanistic Judaism; however, Humanistic Judaism has since stopped graduating cantors.
- 2002: Sharon Hordes was ordained as Reconstructionist Judaism's first cantor in 2002.
- 2002: Avitall Gerstetter became the first female cantor in Jewish Renewal and the first female cantor in Germany.
- 2006: Susan Wehle became the first American female cantor in Jewish Renewal in 2006; she died in 2009.
- 2007: Jalda Rebling, born in Amsterdam, became the first openly lesbian cantor ordained by Jewish Renewal.
- 2009: Tannoz Bahremand Foruzanfar, who was born in Iran, became the first Persian woman to be ordained as a cantor in America.
- 2013: Nancy Abramson became the first female president of the Cantors Assembly, an international professional organization of cantors associated with Conservative Judaism.
- 2025: Jenni Asher became the first Black American woman ordained as a cantor, upon being ordained by the Academy for Jewish Religion California.
