= Hazzan =

Jewish cantor

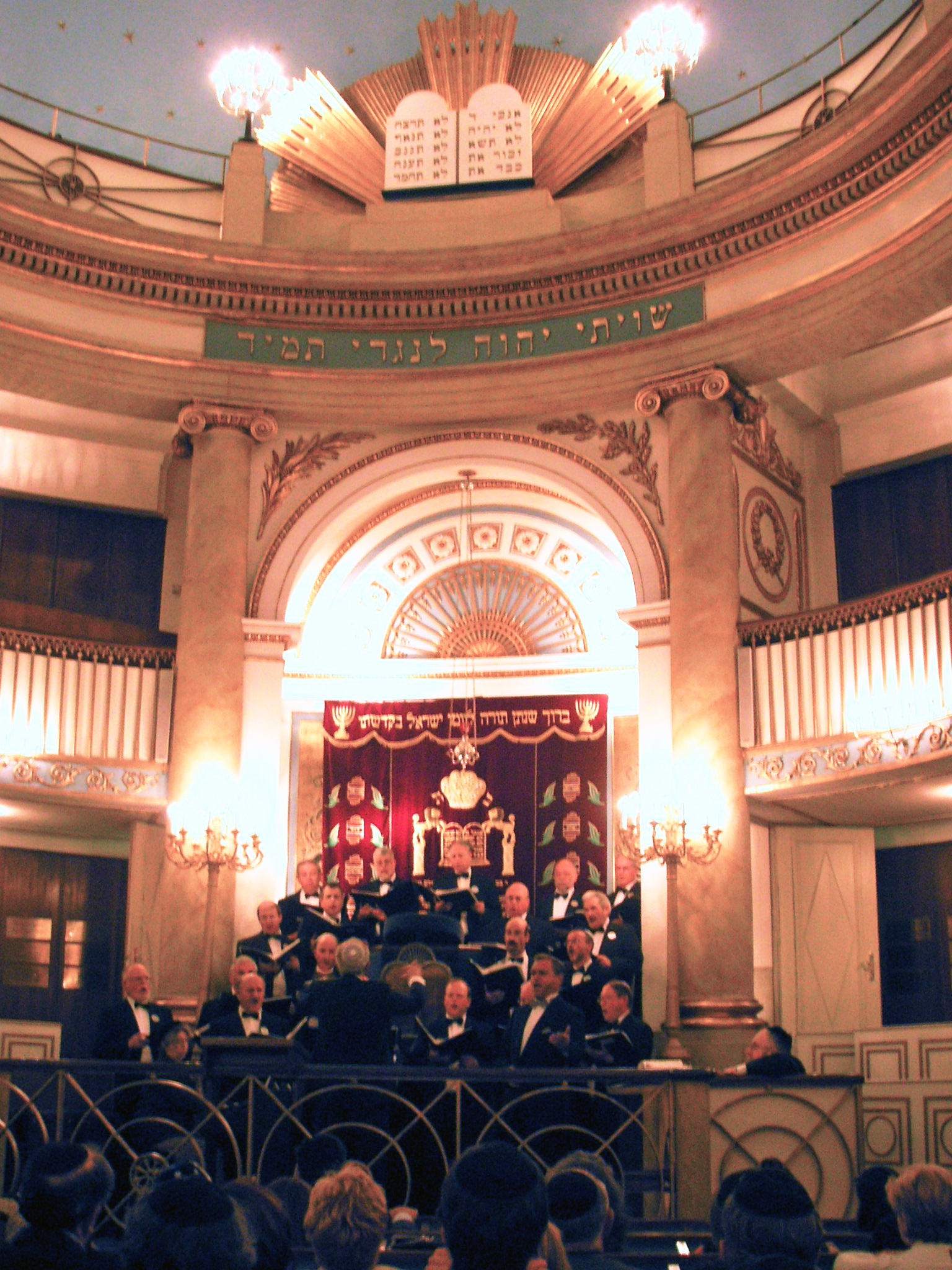
- Cantorial concert in the Vienna Stadttempel synagogue

Occupation
- Names: Cantor
- Occupation type: Jewish religious occupation
- Activity sectors: Synagogue

Description
- Competencies: Hebrew proficiency; mastery of nusach; vocal training
- Education required: Cantorial training or traditional apprenticeship
- Fields of employment: Jewish liturgy and sacred music

Amar Rabbi Elazar
Cantor Meyer Kanewsky's 1919 performance of the last part of Parshat Haketoret, a passage often read after the morning service in Judaism

A hazzan, also spelled chazan, (Note: /ˈhɑːzən/ or /χaˈzan/; Hebrew: [χaˈzan]; Yiddish: חזן, romanized: khazn or /ˈhɑːzən/; Ladino: חזן, romanized: hasan; also /ħaz'zaːn/) is a Jewish musician or precentor trained in the vocal arts who leads the congregation in songful Jewish prayer. In English, a hazzan is often referred to as a cantor, a term also used in Christianity.

An individual leading a Jewish congregation in public prayer is also called a sh'liaḥ tsibbur (Hebrew: שליח ציבור, lit. 'messenger of the public'). Any person is called a sh'liach tzibbur while leading prayer. However, the term hazzan more commonly refers to someone with formal specialized training in leading prayers or who is appointed to lead prayers regularly in a given synagogue without a formally trained hazzan.

== Qualifications ==
Halakha (Jewish law) restricts the role of sh'liah tzibbur to adult Jews; in Orthodox Judaism, only males can lead public prayer before mixed-sex groups. In theory, any layperson can be a sh'liaḥ tsibbur; many synagogue-going Jews will serve in this role from time to time, especially on weekdays or on a yahrzeit. Proficiency in Hebrew pronunciation is preferred. In practice, in synagogues without an official hazzan (or in the temporary absence of one), those with the best voice and the greatest knowledge of the prayers typically assume the role.

Even in the earliest times, the chief qualifications demanded of the hazzan—in addition to knowledge of biblical and liturgical literature and prayer motifs (Yiddish: שטײַגער, romanized: shtayger)—were a pleasant voice and artistic delivery. For the sake of these, many faults were willingly overlooked. The hazzan was required to possess a pleasing appearance, to be married, and to have a flowing beard. Sometimes, according to Isaac ben Moses of Vienna (13th century), a young hazzan having only a slight growth of beard was tolerated. Maimonides ruled that the hazzan who recited the prayers on an ordinary Shabbat and on weekdays need not possess an appearance pleasing to everybody. He might even have a reputation not wholly spotless, provided he was living a life morally free from reproach at the time of his appointment.

All the above-noted moderations of the rules disappeared on holidays, when an especially worthy hazzan was demanded: one whose life was absolutely irreproachable, who was generally popular, and endowed with an expressive delivery. Even a person who had ever litigated in a non-Jewish court—instead of a Jewish court—could not act as hazzan on those days, unless he had previously done penance. However, many authorities were lenient in this regard. As long as a hazzan was accepted by the congregation (מרוצה לקהל, m'rutsei l'qahal), he was permitted to lead the prayers even on the holiest of days.

Today, a hazzan, particularly in more formal (usually not Orthodox) synagogues, is likely to have academic credentials—most often a degree in music or sacred music, sometimes a degree in music education, Jewish religious education, or a related discipline. The doctor of music degree is sometimes awarded to honour a hazzan.

== History ==
Early sources in the Mishnah refer to a position called chazzan hakenesset, which involved leadership roles in public prayer, although not necessarily involving music or singing. Later, as public worship was developed in the Geonic period and as the knowledge of the Hebrew language declined, singing gradually superseded the role of sermons in synagogue worship, and the role of chazzan began to focus on chanting or singing of the prayers. Thus, while the idea of a cantor as a paid professional does not exist in classical rabbinic sources, the office of the hazzan increased in importance with the centuries, evolving a specialized set of skills and becoming a career in itself.

== Professional status ==
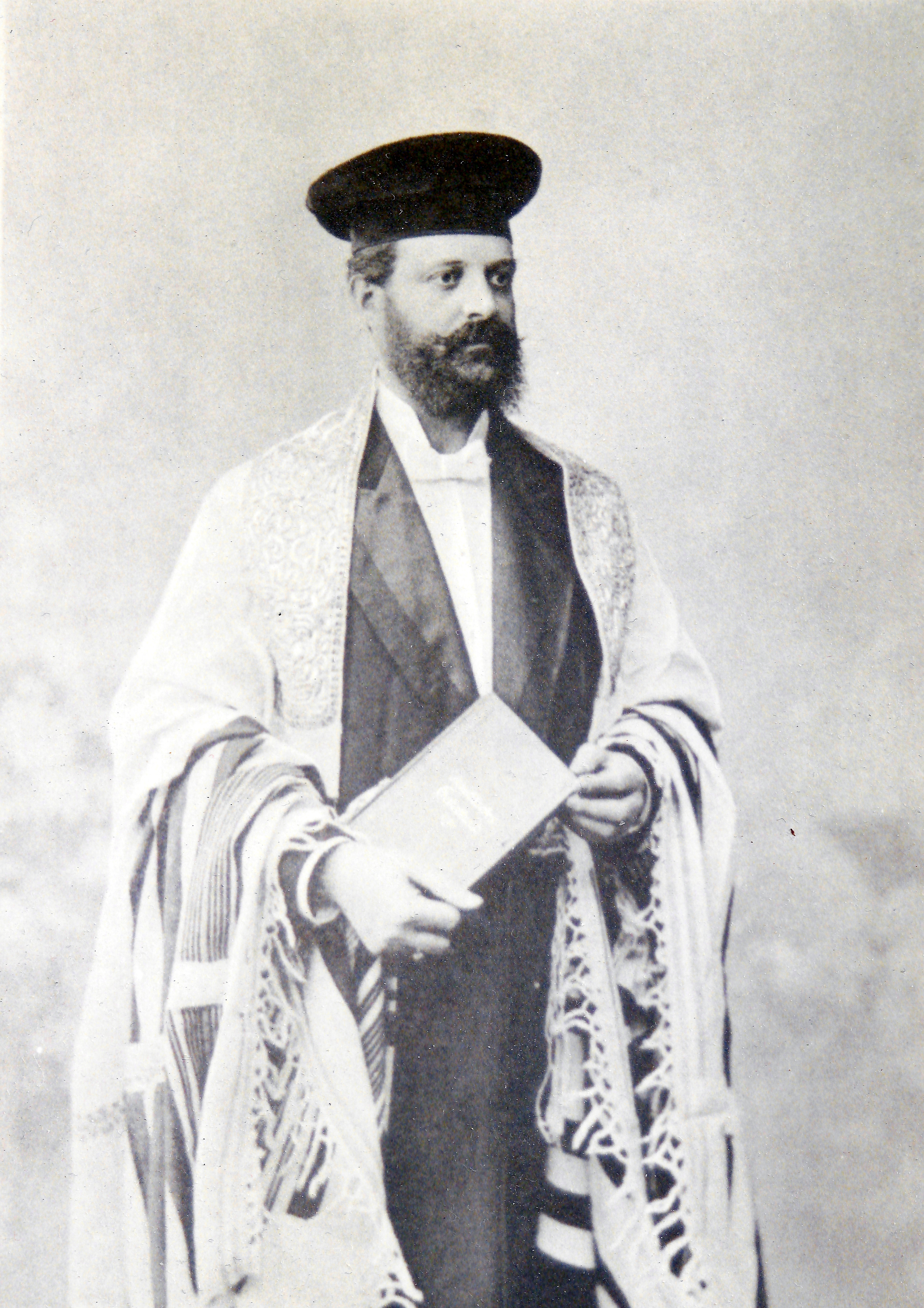
Hazzan Mayer Schorr in 1902, wearing a traditional Ashkenazi hazzan hat

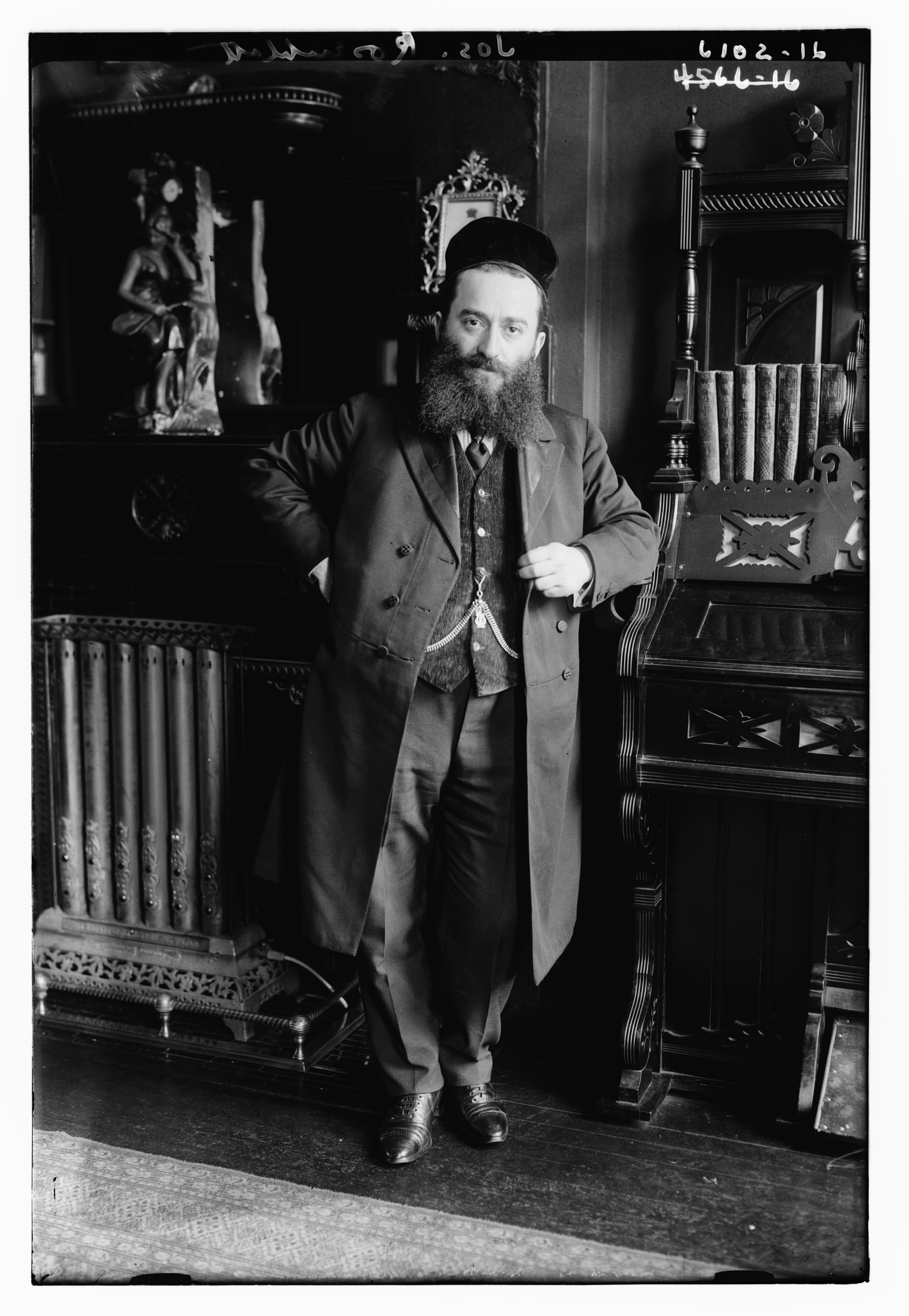
Yossele Rosenblatt, widely regarded as the greatest cantor of his time, in 1923

The role of the hazzan as a respected full-time profession has become a reality in recent centuries. In the last two centuries, Jews in a number of European communities, notably Germany and Britain, came to view professionally trained hazzanim as clergy and the hazzan as the deputy rabbi. After the enlightenment, when European nations gave full citizenship and civil rights to Jews, professionally trained hazzanim were accepted by the secular governments as clergy just as rabbis were.

Paradoxically, the United States government recognized cantors as the first Jewish clergy, even before rabbis were recognized: as a congregation could be organized and led by a committee of Jewish laypersons, who would not have the expertise in liturgy a hazzan would have, newly forming congregations in the late 19th and early 20th centuries sometimes hired a hazzan for a synagogue (and made sure that a kosher butcher was established in the neighborhood) for some time before setting about hiring a rabbi, seeing the hazzan (and the shokhet, or kosher butcher) as a more immediate need. The hazzan therefore solemnized marriages and otherwise represented the congregation in the eyes of civil authorities.

In the United States, many hazzanim supplement their ministry by also earning certification as mohels for bris ceremonies.

In the United States, there are three main organizations for professionally trained hazzanim, one from each of the major Jewish denominations:

- American Conference of Cantors—Reform Judaism
- Cantors Assembly—Conservative Judaism
- Cantorial Council of America—Orthodox Judaism

=== Training ===
Many members of the Cantors Assembly are trained at the H. L. Miller Cantorial School and College of Jewish Music at the Jewish Theological Seminary of America. Many members of the American Conference of Cantors are trained at the Debbie Friedman School of Sacred Music at Hebrew Union College—Jewish Institute of Religion in New York. Both of these programs offer a five-year training program. Members of the Cantorial Council, the Orthodox cantorial association, can train at the Philip and Sarah Belz School of Jewish Music at Yeshiva University in New York.

ALEPH, the Alliance for Jewish Renewal, includes a cantorial training program as part of its ordination program.

Full cantorial training is also offered by the Cantorial School of the Academy for Jewish Religion (California) in Los Angeles, the Cantorial Program at the similarly named Academy for Jewish Religion in New York, and the School of Jewish Music at Hebrew College. These institutions are unaffiliated with any particular Jewish denomination.

The curricula for students in these programs generally include, but are not limited to:

- Hebrew: modern, Biblical (Torah), and liturgical (siddur)
- Nusach (liturgical tradition)
- Laws and traditions pertaining to Jewish prayer service
- History and content of the siddur
- Music theory, sight-reading
- Playing an instrument, usually a piano or guitar
- Singing technique
- Cantillation—tropes for the liturgical chanting of biblical books
- Choral conducting
- Jewish history
- Tanakh (Hebrew Bible)
- Jewish music history
- Pastoral care and counseling
- Theology

=== Non-Orthodox titles ===
Until 2012, neither the Reform nor Conservative streams used the term ordained for trained cantors; use of the term invested precluded confusion with those they titled rabbi. In 2021, Conservative Judaism's flagship institution, the Jewish Theological Seminary, began using the term ordain with respect to cantors.

== Female cantors in non-Orthodox Judaism ==
In the 21st century, most streams of non-Orthodox Judaism no longer maintain gender distinctions, and therefore women often serve as cantors in these communities.

The earliest known woman ḥazzan, Julie Rosewald, called "Cantor Soprano" by her congregation, is sometimes called the United States' first female cantor, serving San Francisco's Temple Emanu-El from 1884 until 1893. However, she was not ordained.

Another early and un-ordained woman ḥazzan was Madame Goldye Steiner, who sang in cantorial concerts as well as in Broadway shows throughout the 1920s. She was one of the first African-American female cantors.

In 1955, Betty Robbins (born Berta Abramson in 1924, in Greece) was appointed as cantor of Temple Avodah, a Reform congregation in Oceanside, New York. Like Rosewald, she was not formally ordained, but "the spokesman for the School of Sacred Music, founded in 1947 as the first training school for cantors in [the United States], said today there was no religious law, merely a tradition, against women becoming cantors", indicating the school's institutional approval.

In 1975 Barbara Ostfeld-Horowitz became the first ordained female cantor in Jewish history.

The Women Cantors' Network was founded in 1982 to support and advocate for women cantors by Deborah Katchko, the second woman ever to serve as a cantor in a Conservative synagogue. Initially a group of only twelve women, its membership grew to 90 by 1996. The organization holds an annual conference.

In 1987 Erica Lippitz and Marla Rosenfeld Barugel became the first two female cantors ordained in Conservative Judaism; they were ordained at the same time by the Cantors Institute of the Jewish Theological Seminary in New York City.

The Cantors Assembly, a professional organization of cantors associated with Conservative Judaism, did not allow women to join until 1990.

Sharon Hordes became the first cantor (female or otherwise) in Reconstructionist Judaism in 2002.

Avitall Gerstetter, who lived in Germany, became the first female cantor in Jewish Renewal (and the first female cantor in Germany) in 2002.

Susan Wehle became the first American female cantor in Jewish Renewal in 2006, serving until her death in 2009. The first American women to be ordained as cantors in Jewish Renewal after Susan Wehle's ordination were Michal Rubin and Abbe Lyons, both ordained on January 10, 2010.

In 2001 Deborah Davis became the first cantor (female or otherwise) in Humanistic Judaism; however, Humanistic Judaism has since stopped graduating cantors.

In 2009, Iran-born Tannoz Bahremand Foruzanfar was ordained as a cantor by the non-denominational Academy for Jewish Religion (California), becoming the first female Persian ordained cantor in the United States.

== Golden age ==
The period between the two world wars is often referred to as the "golden age" of hazzanut (cantorial performance). The great figures of this era include Zavel Kwartin (1874–1953), Moritz Henle (1850–1925), Joseph "Yossele" Rosenblatt (1882–1933), Gershon Sirota (1874–1943), and Leib Glantz.

In the post–World War II period, prominent cantors were Moshe Koussevitzky, David Werdyger, Frank Birnbaum, Richard Tucker and Abraham Lopes Cardozo (1914–2006). Operatic tenor Jan Peerce, whose cantorial recordings were highly regarded, was never a cantor by profession but often served as one during the High Holidays.

Popular contemporary cantors include Shmuel Barzilai, Naftali Hershtik, Yitzchak Meir Helfgot, Chazzan Avraham Aharon Weingarten, Ari Klein, Yaakov Lemmer, Joseph Malovany, Benzion Miller, Jacob (Jack) Mendelson, Aaron Bensoussan, Aaron Aderet, Alberto Mizrahi, Yaakov Yoseph Stark, Jochen (Yaacov) Fahlenkamp, Meir Finkelstein, Alex Stein, Daniel Gross, Azi Schwartz, Netanel Hershtik and Eli Weinberg.

== Hazzan Sheni ==
The title Hazzan Sheni (Sheni means 'second') can refer to

- a hazzan who plays that role when the main hazzan does not officiate
- a hazzan who fills a different spot, such as when the main hazzan leads Musaf, and the Sheni leads Shacharit.

== See also ==
- Cantor in Reform Judaism
- Cantors Assembly (Conservative)
- Hassan (surname)
- Hebrew Union College-Jewish Institute of Religion (Reform)
- History of the Jews in Europe
- The Jazz Singer
- Jewish music
- Rabbi
- Synagogue
- Timeline of women hazzans
