= Abbe Lyons =

American female hazzan

Abbe Lyons was one of the first three American women to be ordained as cantors in the Jewish Renewal, along with Susan Wehle and Michal Rubin. They were ordained on January 10, 2010. She now works for the Congregation Tikkun v’Or in Ithaca, New York, where in addition to being a cantor she leads the bar and bat mitzvahs.

Prior to becoming a cantor, Lyons earned a degree in voice performance from Ithaca College, then moved to California to study the Feldenkrais Method of Somatic Education. It was there that she became involved in Jewish Renewal.
