= Susanna Freeborn =

17th and 18th-century Quaker minister

Personal details
- Born: 1674 Portsmouth, Rhode Island, United States
- Died: 1723 (aged 48–49)
- Denomination: Society of Friends
- Parents: Gideon Freeborn; Sarah Brownell Freeborn

Susanna Freeborn (1674–1723) was a minister in the Religious Society of Friends (Quakers) in Providence, Rhode Island. She travelled with Esther Palmer on Palmer's epic journey of 3,230 miles through eight colonies.

== Life ==
Freeborn was born in Portsmouth, Rhode Island, in 1674 to Gideon Freeborn (1640-1720) and his wife Sarah (Brownell) Freeborn (1640-1676).

== See also ==
- Ordination of women
- Susanna Freeborn and Esther Palmer, Journall of Susanna Freeborn and Esther Palmer from Rhoad Island to and from Pennsylvania, 28/8M/1704. MS. Box X 1/10. Library of the Society of Friends, London.
- Quaker biographical sketches of ministers and elders, Philadelphia Yearly Meeting of the Society of Friends, 1972.
- Meredith Baldwin Weddle, Walking in the Way of Peace: Quaker Pacifism in the Seventeenth Century, Oxford University Press, 2001.
- Alan Taylor, Writing Early American History, University of Pennsylvania Press, 2006.
- H. M. Jenkins, Old Times in Nantucket, Friends Intelligencer, Society of Friends, volume 53, 1896, page 516.
- Christopher Coffin Hussey, Recollections of Nantucket — I, Friends' Intelligencer United with the Friends' Journal, vol 43, 1886.
