= Deborah Davis (hazzan) =

Humanistic Judaism cantor and klezmer musician

Deborah Davis is the first hazzan (also called cantor) in Humanistic Judaism. She was ordained in 2001. She is the lead singer of (and a founder of) the Second Avenue Klezmer Ensemble, which she also named.
