= Cantors Assembly =

- Founded: 1947
- Tax ID no.: 13-1959506
- Legal status: 501(c)(3) nonprofit organization
- Headquarters: Fairlawn, Ohio, United States
- Coordinates: 41.126087°N 81.6092152°W
- Revenue: $720,558 (2013)
- Expenses: $863,193 (2013)
- Endowment: $81,829
- Employees: 6 (2023)
- Volunteers: 75 (2023)
- Website: www.cantors.org

Cantors Assembly is the international association of hazzanim (cantors) affiliated with Conservative Judaism. It was founded in 1947 to develop the profession of the hazzan, to foster the fellowship and welfare of hazzanim, and to establish a conservatory for hazzanim. The latter goal was realized in 1952 with the establishment of the Cantors Institute at the Jewish Theological Seminary of America. This Institute later developed into the H. L. Miller Cantorial School of the Jewish Theological Seminary of America.

Cantors Assembly first allowed women to join in 1990; women have been ordained as hazzanim in Conservative Judaism since 1987.

In 2013, Nancy Abramson became the first female president of Cantors Assembly. In 2017, Alisa Pomerantz-Boro became the second female president.

Cantors Assembly is the largest body of hazzanim in the world. Cantors Assembly's mission statement says that it serves its members and congregations while also helping "preserve and enhance the traditions of our people".

== See also ==
- Rabbinical Assembly
- Jewish Theological Seminary of America
- Cantor in Reform Judaism
