= Barbara Ostfeld =

American cantor; Jewish history's first ordained female cantor

Personal life
- Born: Barbara Ostfeld; 1952 (age 73–74) St. Louis, Missouri

Religious life
- Religion: Jewish
- School: Hebrew Union College-Jewish Institute of Religion
- Sect: Reform
- Profession: Cantor
- Ordination: 1975

Barbara Jean Ostfeld, formerly known as Barbara Ostfeld-Horowitz, is an American cantor, feminist, mental health advocate, and author. She is recognized as the first woman to be ordained as a cantor in Jewish history.

== Early life and education ==
Barbara Jean Ostfeld was born in 1952 in St. Louis, Missouri, and grew up in Elmhurst, Illinois. Her mother, Ruth Vogel Ostfeld, was an occupational therapist, cellist, and political activist. Her father, Adrian M. Ostfeld, was a professor of public health at Yale University. Her grandparents immigrated to the United States from Austria-Hungary and Bucharest.

Ostfeld showed an early interest in religious and secular music. Nicknamed “Barbi,” she enjoyed singing liturgical music she learned at her synagogue, Oak Park Temple, a Reform congregation in Oak Park, Illinois. At the age of eight, Ostfeld decided to pursue a career as a cantor.

She began piano lessons as a child and started voice lessons at age 11. Her voice teacher encouraged her to audition for the children’s chorus of the Lyric Opera of Chicago, and although she was accepted, her father did not permit her to participate.

In 1968, she taught herself to play the guitar and, inspired by music from the Elizabethan era, began playing the harpsichord. That same summer, she attended Jewish summer camp at the Olin-Sang Union Institute, a camp affiliated with the Union of American Hebrew Congregations, in Oconomowoc, Wisconsin. There, she participated in Torah study for the first time.

== Cantorial school ==
In 1969, Ostfeld contacted the registrar of Hebrew Union College – Jewish Institute of Religion in New York City to request an application to the School of Sacred Music. The registrar noted that no woman had previously made such a request but provided the application without objection. Ostfeld was admitted to the cantorial program in 1970, despite not knowing the Hebrew alphabet at the time.

When she entered the cantorial program—then open to undergraduates—Ostfeld was the only woman among twenty-two students, most of whom were in their twenties. During her first year, she was interviewed by The New York Times alongside another new female applicant, Sheila Cline.

Faculty members at the School of Sacred Music generally supported Ostfeld’s academic development. Vocal coaches had to adjust to working with a higher voice type within a repertoire traditionally sung by male cantors. Initially, she was instructed to lip-sync during chorus rehearsals and performances in order to preserve the all-male choral sound.

Ostfeld was ordained as a cantor on June 6, 1975, at Temple Emanu-El in New York City. Following her ordination, she continued serving in her student pulpit at Temple Beth Shalom in Clifton, New Jersey, as cantor-educator during 1975 and 1976.

== Career ==
Ostfeld's first formal cantorial position was at Temple Beth-El in Great Neck, New York, where she served from 1976 to 1988. Although she generally received support, she also encountered challenges related to sexism and sexual harassment.

From 1986 to 1988, while still serving at Temple Beth-El, Ostfeld was an adjunct faculty member at the School of Sacred Music, where she taught Reform cantorial repertoire. She was later offered the position of director of the School of Sacred Music but declined in order to continue her work in the pulpit.

In 1988, she became the cantor of Temple B’rith Kodesh in Brighton, Monroe County, New York. Two years later, she accepted a position as cantor at Temple Beth Am (now merged into Congregation Shir Shalom) in Williamsville, New York, where she served until 2002.

In 1994, Ostfeld appeared in The Cantor: A Calling for Today, a PBS documentary produced by Cantor Michael Shochet. The documentary includes an interview with Ostfeld, as well as appearances by her childhood cantor, Martin Rosen—who served as an early inspiration for her career—and Steven Weiss, a former bar mitzvah student of Ostfeld who was beginning his own cantorial studies at the time. The Cantor: A Calling For Today

Over the course of her career, Ostfeld tutored approximately 1,500 b'nei mitzvah students. She also taught courses, frequently with a focus on feminist themes, at Buffalo’s High School for Jewish Studies under the auspices of the Board of Jewish Education.

In 2002, Ostfeld became Director of Placement for the American Conference of Cantors. In this role, she worked with congregations and cantors to facilitate appropriate placements and develop position descriptions. She also provided guidance on resumes, audition materials, applications, and interview preparation. During her ten-year tenure, she collaborated with approximately 200 congregations across North America.

Ostfeld was also involved in youth choir leadership, organizing participation in interfaith initiatives, Holocaust education, famine relief, and other projects associated with tikkun olam. Upon her retirement in 2012, she was named Placement Director Emerita of the American Conference of Cantors. She continues to serve on its board of trustees and contributes to its Task Force on Women in the Cantorate.

Ostfeld also served a term as chair of the Union for Reform Judaism's Joint Cantorial Placement Commission.

== Awards and honors ==
n March 2000, Barbara Jean Ostfeld received an honorary Doctor of Music degree from Hebrew Union College–Jewish Institute of Religion. In December 2019, she was awarded the Debbie Friedman Award, the highest musical honor in Reform Judaism.

== Personal life ==
Ostfeld became a mental health advocate by publicly sharing her personal experiences with psychological challenges, which began in childhood and continued into adulthood.

As a child, she experienced chronic anxiety and a strong desire to please her demanding and often irritable father. Singing provided her with a sense of validation and comfort due to the positive attention she received. However, after being mocked by classmates in elementary school, she began to reduce her vocal volume and sing with her mouth partially closed.

At age fifteen, after a crisis involving her father's substance use brought significant strain to her family, Ostfeld began engaging in self-harm.

At age twenty-two, after she began her first congregational role in New Jersey, Ostfeld found herself unsettled by the degree of public scrutiny directed at her physical appearance and developed an eating disorder, which therapy did not fully resolve.

In her early forties, during a period marked by the end of her marriage, Ostfeld experienced a decline in her mental health. She again sought therapy and was diagnosed with depression and anxiety. She began taking antidepressants and engaged in regular psychotherapy.

Following the deaths of her younger sister and mother, Ostfeld experienced a recurrence of depression. She subsequently began cognitive behavioral therapy as part of her ongoing mental health care.

In her mid-sixties, while Ostfeld was working on her memoir, a query from her editor prompted her to reveal that she had been raped by strangers on a Manhattan street when she was a nineteen-year-old seminary student. She had told no one at the time, and only a few people in subsequent years. The MeToo movement had begun by then, and Ostfeld felt strongly that although the book was nearing publication, it was necessary to tell this part of her story, which had secretly affected much of her writing and thinking. After making this decision, she found that she was finally able to talk about the long-suppressed sexual assault in a therapy session for the first time. Her therapist diagnosed her with post-traumatic stress disorder.

Today, Ostfeld speaks openly about her experiences with mental illness and advocates for recognizing mental health care as an essential component of overall medical care.

She is the mother of two adult daughters and resides in the Buffalo-Niagara Falls metropolitan area with her husband, Todd.

== Selected works ==
=== Memoir ===
Barbara Jean Ostfeld's memoir, Catbird: The Ballad of Barbi Prim, was published in 2019 by Erva Press.

=== Other writings ===
In addition to her memoir, Ostfeld is the author of “The Ascent of the Woman Cantor,” an essay included in Elyse Goldstein’s New Jewish Feminism (Jewish Lights Publishing, 2012). Her essay “Woman Cantors and Dollars in 1976” was published in the Fall 2018 issue of The Reform Jewish Quarterly. She has also contributed essays to 10 Minutes of Torah, a daily email publication of the Reform Jewish community, and to the Lilith Magazine blog.

== Bibliography ==
- Encyclopaedia Judaica Yearbook 1975/6, Keter Publishing House Jerusalem Ltd, 1976.
- Mark Slobin, Chosen Voices The Story of the American Cantorate, University of Illinois Press, 1989.
- Judah M. Cohen, The Making of a Reform Jewish Cantor, Indiana University Press, 2009.
- Bruce Ruben, “Barbara Ostfeld, Unassuming Pioneer,” Journal of American Synagogue Music 32, 2007.
- Michael Shochet, The Cantor: A Calling for Today, 1994, The Cantor: A Calling For Today
