= Tannoz Bahremand Foruzanfar =

Persian cantor in the United States

Tannoz Bahremand Foruzanfar became the first Persian woman to be ordained as a cantor in the United States in 2009. Foruzanfar was born in Tehran and moved to the United States when she was two. She now works at Stephen S. Wise Temple in California. She holds a Bachelor of Science degree in Education with an emphasis in Music from the University of Southern California, as well as cantorial ordination from the Academy for Jewish Religion in California.

She appeared in From the Shtetl to Broadway, a Yiddish musical review.
