= Avitall Gerstetter =

German cantor

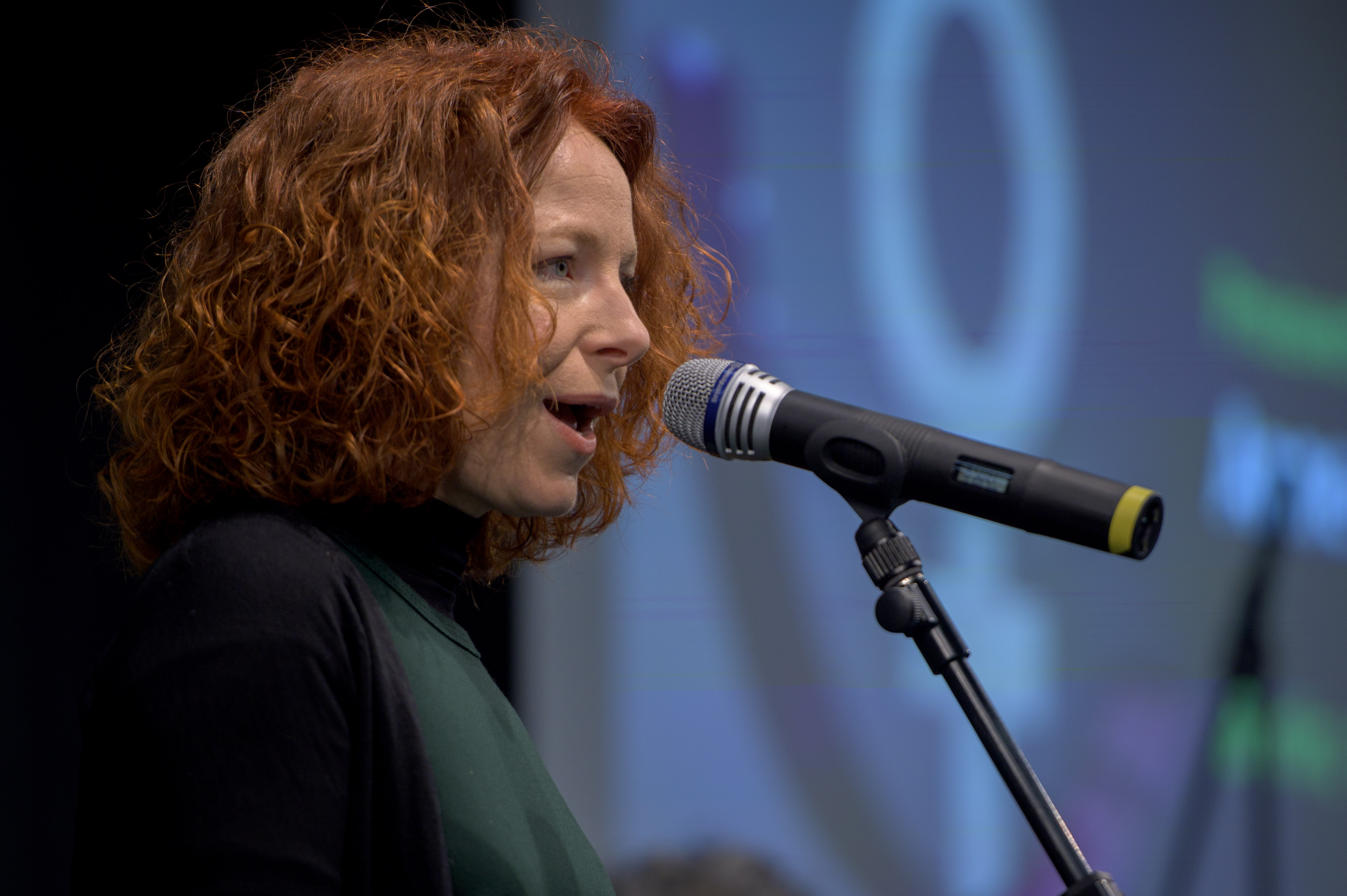
Avitalli Gerstetter (2019)

Avitall Gerstetter (Hebrew: אביטל גרסטטר; born 1972) is the first female hazzan (cantor) in Jewish Renewal and the first female cantor in Germany.

== Early life ==
Gerstetter was born into a Jewish family in 1972. Her father is a convert to Judaism.

== Career ==
Gerstetter was ordained in 2002. She served as a cantor in Berlin together with cantor Mimi Sheffer and Rabbi Daniela Thau; this was the first time after the Holocaust that women had led the services of the High Holy Days. She served until August 2022 as cantor in the Oranienburger Straße Synagogue and in the Hüttenweg Synagogue in Berlin, and has created several CDs. In August 2022 she published a letter in Die Welt, stating that converts to Judaism in Germany pose a threat to Jewish communities nationwide. The following week she was fired from her position in the Berlin Jewish Community.

== Awards ==
In 2007 Avitall was awarded the title of ‘Ambassador for Tolerance’ by the Bündnis für Demokratie und Toleranz of the German government.
