= Susan Wehle =

American Jewish Renewal cantor (1953–2009)

- Born: 14 May 1953
- Died: 12 February 2009 (aged 55); Clarence, New York, U.S.
- Occupation: Jewish Renewal cantor
- Employer(s): Temple Beth Am; Temple Sinai
- Known for: First American female Jewish Renewal cantor
- Works: Songs of Healing and Hope
- Children: Jonah Wehle; Jake Wehle
- Parent(s): Hana Wehle; Kurt Wehle

Susan Wehle (May 14, 1953 – February 12, 2009) was ordained the first American female Jewish Renewal cantor (hazzan) in 2006.

Wehle was a cantor for Temple Beth Am in Williamsville, New York and Temple Sinai in Amherst, New York for nine years. She created one CD, Songs of Healing and Hope. Wehle also directed youth and adult choirs and appeared in concerts across the United States, Canada, and Israel.

Weile was the daughter of Holocaust survivors Hana and Kurt Wehle, and had two sons, Jonah and Jake. She died on February 12, 2009, in the crash of Colgan Air Flight 3407 in Clarence, New York.
