= Cantor in Reform Judaism =

Member of the Jewish Clergy

The cantor (Hebrew: חַזָּן Hazzan or Hazan) in the Reform movement is a clergy member who fills a diverse role within the Jewish community. Cantors lead worship, officiate at lifecycle events, teach adults and children, run synagogue music programs, and offer pastoral care. Cantors typically serve along with other clergy members, usually rabbis and occasionally additional cantors, in partnership to lead synagogue communities. The Reform cantor is a professional office with a prescribed educational path and professional organization. Cantors are "invested", a term borrowed from the idea of priestly vestments, at the conclusion of study. "Investiture" confers the status of clergy to cantors, just as "ordination" does for rabbis.

As of 2011, a decision has been made to "ordain" rather than "invest" cantors.

== Hebrew Union College ==
=== History ===
Cantors in the North American Reform Movement are trained by the Hebrew Union College – Jewish Institute of Religion, School of Sacred Music. Located near New York University, the school offers the degree of Master of Sacred Music. Upon graduation, students receive formal ordination as cantor and then become eligible for membership in the American Conference of Cantors, the professional organization for cantors.

The School of Sacred Music was established in 1948 as a response to the "growing number of Reform congregations... prepared to employ a cantor if qualified individuals could be found," under the leadership of Eric Werner. American synagogues in the mid-twentieth century were increasingly populated by second generation American Jews and Jews who viewed themselves as fully American. These communities could no longer relate to the European-trained cantors of their communal past. Judah Cohen observes that "the American cantorial school rose on the crest of both a revival and reevaluation of the cantor in the postwar era. Placing standards of cantorial knowledge and ability within a curricular framework," the School of Sacred Music "attempted to improve the cantor's religious standing."

At its inception, the SSM was the first and only American cantorial school and sought to educate cantors to serve all American Jewish communities. While the school's founders, including the influential members of The Society for the Advancement of Jewish Liturgical Music, articulated their desire to create a cantorial school for all of American Jewry, particular attention was given to serving the Reform Movement's specific needs since the SSM's inception. HUC Dean Franzlblau conducted an exploratory survey of North American Reform congregations to gauge their "receptivity to cantor-educators in 1948." The results of the study revealed that congregations would be most receptive to hiring well-trained cantors who were prepared to take on significant education roles in synagogues. The school's earliest curriculum responded to this need, training what were called "cantor-educators", or cantors with additional training in education. Cantorial certification was awarded after three years of study. The SSM has since undergone a significant evolution, first offering a bachelor's degree in four years, beginning in the fall of 1953), and ultimately conferring a Master of Sacred Music over the course of five years and culminating with investiture as cantor.

=== Today ===
Today, the curriculum of the SSM includes liturgical music classes covering traditional Shabbat, High Holiday and Festival nusach, Chorus, Musicology, Reform Liturgy and Composition; Judaica and text classes such as Bible, Midrash and History; and professional development. Each student is assigned practica (mini-recitals) during the second, third and fourth years of school culminating with a Senior Recital (based on a thesis) during the fifth year. As of 2011, the institution was renamed the Debbie Friedman School of Sacred Music.

== American Conference of Cantors ==
Successful completion of the five-year School of Sacred Music program allows the newly ordained cantor membership in the American Conference of Cantors. This professional organization was established in 1953 by the early graduates of the SSM. The ACC currently serves over 450 cantors, offering conventions, newsletters, a listserve, and placement support. The ACC is the professional organization of invested and/or certified Reform cantors. Responsible for raising the professional standards of synagogue musicians, the ACC offers continuing education programs in conjunction with HUC-JIR School of Sacred Music and professional development opportunities for its members. Members of the ACC have special expertise in the music of the Jewish people and serve synagogues and communities in pastoral, worship, programming, and educational roles. The ACC sponsors an annual convention and publishes Koleinu, a regular newsletter. It also offers placement services to its members and URJ congregations through the Joint Cantorial Placement Commission. The American Conference of Cantors is an affiliate of the Union for Reform Judaism. In 1991 Vicki L. Axe became the first woman to serve as president of the American Conference of Cantors. In 2013 Mark C. Goldman became the first openly gay president of the American Conference of Cantors.

== Women in the Reform Cantorate ==
In 1968, Sally Priesand became the first woman accepted for rabbinic training at Hebrew Union College. When Sally Priesand was ordained in 1972, she became the first female rabbi in America. By 1970, Hebrew Union College also began admitting female students for formal cantorial studies. In 1975, [Barbara Ostfeld] became the first woman to be ordained as a female cantor. Following graduation, she received pulpit placement and was inducted into the American Conference of Cantors, the professional organization for cantors. Ostfeld's investiture "marked an era of rapid demographic change" at the SSM, investing more than 179 female cantors. Reflecting on her profession, Ostfeld writes, "Women cantors have altered the way in which prayer is offered, heard, and received."

== Evolving role ==
The historian of the cantorate Mark Slobin explores the evolution of the office of the cantor in his work Chosen Voices: The Story of the American Cantorate. Slobin outlines the journey of cantor as a sacred singer who would find employment by responding to positions posted in the newspaper in the 1930s to the formalized process of cantor/congregation matchmaking now in place. The creation of the School of Sacred Music in 1948 marks the beginning of the cantor as a modern professional. At the inception of the SSM, the role of the cantor in the American synagogue was so narrow that the concept of the "cantor-educator" was created so that the newly minted cantors would have the additional skill set of "educator" so that they could serve congregations in a full-time capacity. The school abandoned the notion of the "cantor-educator" as the perception of the modern cantorate expanded to include the duties now associated with the role of the full-time cantor. The role of today's Reform cantor includes inspiring others in the act of worship, serving as an authority on Religious Jewish music, teaching all members of their community, helping to build strong Jewish identities, offering pastoral care, and officiating at life cycle events. Even though the cantor fills a diverse role in the modern Reform synagogue, the "heart of the cantorate" remains in "the sanctuary", leading the Jewish people in prayer.

== Bibliography ==
- Cohen, Judah. The Making of a Reform Cantor. Bloomington: Indiana University Press, 2009.
- Meyer, Michael A. The History of Hebrew Union College-Jewish Institute of Religion: A Centennial History 1875–1975. Cincinnati: Hebrew Union College Press, 1976.
- Slobin, Mark. Chosen Voices: The Story of the American Cantor. Chicago: University of Illinois, 2002.
