= Timeline of women in religion =

This is a timeline of women in religion. See also: Timeline of women in religion in the United States, and Timeline of women's ordination.

== Timeline ==
=== Ancient history and Middle Ages ===
- 8th–7th century BCE Livy, Plutarch, and Aulus Gellius attribute the creation of the Vestal Virgins as a state-supported priestesshood to king Numa Pompilius, who reigned circa 717–673 BC.
- 6th century BCE Mahapajapati Gotami, the aunt and foster mother of Buddha, became the first woman to receive Buddhist ordination.
- 2nd century CE Shlama Beth Qidra is the earliest attested Mandaean scribe and copied the Left Ginza from the Mandaean holy book Ginza Rabba.
- 4th century The Temple of Vesta was closed in 391 by the Roman emperor Theodosius I, and Coelia Concordia, the last vestal virgin in history and the last Vestalis Maxima or Chief Vestal, stepped down from her post in 394.
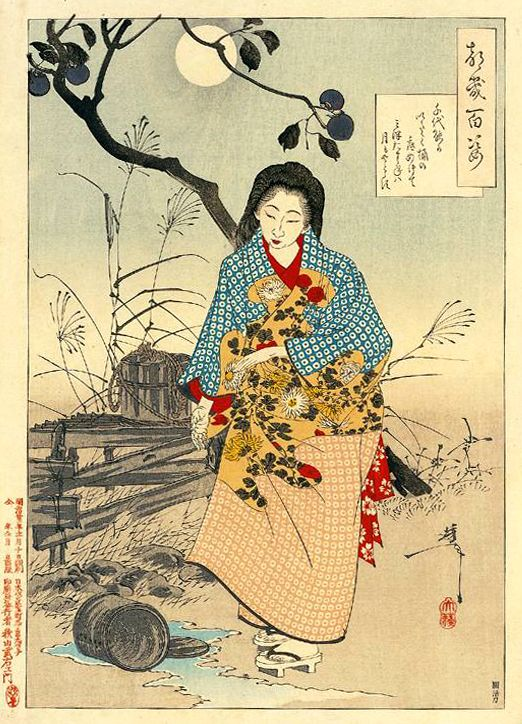
  Yoshitoshi's Lady Chiyo (Nyodai) and the Broken Water Bucket
- 5th century Prajñātārā was the twenty-seventh Indian Patriarch of Zen Buddhism and teacher of Bodhidharma. While Prajñātārā has generally been assumed to be male and is listed among the Chan Patriarchs (all of whom are male), 20th century Buddhist practitioners have suggested that Prajñātārā might have been a woman.
- 735: The Latin Church decided that women must be allowed to attend liturgies and receive Holy Communion during their menstruation.
- 8th century Andal, the only female Alvar, was active at this time, although hagiographic tradition asserts that Andal lived around 3000 BCE. (Orthodoxy posits the number of Alvars as ten, though there are other references that include Andal and Madhurakavi Alvar, making the number twelve.)
- 13th century The first female Zen master in Japan was the Japanese abbess Mugai Nyodai (born 1223 – died 1298).

=== 17th to 18th centuries ===
- 17th century: Asenath Barzani is considered the first female rabbi of Jewish history by some scholars; additionally, she is the oldest recorded female Kurdish leader in history.
- 17th century: In England in the 17th century Elizabeth Hooton became the first female Quaker minister.
- 1636 to 1643: Though she predates the start of the United States by over 100 years, the influence of Anne Hutchinson on later American Colonial values with respect to civil liberty and religious freedoms was as important as her contemporary Roger Williams.
- 1660: British Quaker Margaret Fell (1614–1702) published a famous pamphlet to justify equal roles for men and women in the denomination, titled: "Women's Speaking Justified, Proved and Allowed of by the Scriptures, All Such as Speak by the Spirit and Power of the Lord Jesus And How Women Were the First That Preached the Tidings of the Resurrection of Jesus, and Were Sent by Christ's Own Command Before He Ascended to the Father (John 20:17)."
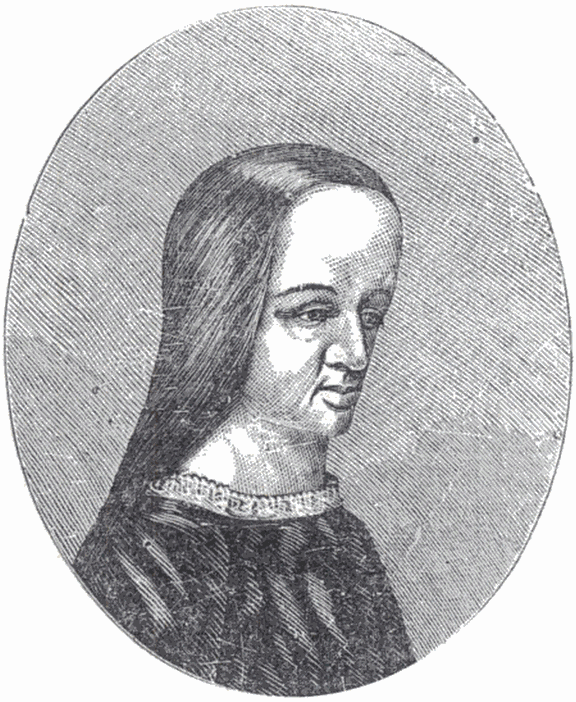
- Ann Lee, founder of the Shakers
  Circa 1770: Mary Evans Thorne was appointed class leader by Joseph Pilmore in Philadelphia, making her probably the first woman in America to be so appointed.
- 1774: Ann Lee and her followers arrive in New York City.
- 1775: Ann Lee and her followers establish the first communal home of the United Society of Believers in Christ's Second Appearance (aka the Shakers) seven miles West of Albany, NY.
- 1775: In his encyclical Allatae Sunt of 26 July 1755, Pope Benedict XIV explicitly condemned females serving the priest at the altar with the following words:
  "Pope Gelasius in his ninth letter (chap. 26) to the bishops of Lucania condemned the evil practice which had been introduced of women serving the priest at the celebration of Mass. Since this abuse had spread to the Greeks, Innocent IV strictly forbade it in his letter to the bishop of Tusculum: "Women should not dare to serve at the altar; they should be altogether refused this ministry." We too have forbidden this practice in the same words in Our oft-repeated constitution Etsi Pastoralis, sect. 6, no. 21."
- Late 18th century: John Wesley allowed women to preach within his Methodist movement.

=== 19th century ===
- 19th century: Women's mosques, called nusi, and female imams have existed since the 19th century in China and continue today.
- 19th century: Hannah Rachel Verbermacher, also known as the Maiden of Ludmir (Ludmirer Moyd), became the only female Rebbe in the history of the Hasidic movement; she lived in Ukraine and Israel.
- Early 19th century: In the United States, in contrast with almost every other organized denomination, the Society of Friends (Quakers) has allowed women to serve as ministers since the early 19th century.
- 1807: The Primitive Methodist Church in Britain first allowed female ministers.
- 1810: The Christian Connection Church, an early relative of the Christian Church (Disciples of Christ) and the United Church of Christ, ordained women as early as 1810.
- 1815:
- Clarissa Danforth was ordained in New England. She was the first woman ordained by the Free Will Baptist denomination.
- The first petition for the African Methodist Episcopal Church General Conference to license women to preach was defeated.
- 1830: In Harmony, PA, Emma Hale Smith was promised that she would be ordained "to expound scriptures, and to exhort the church, according as it shall be given thee by my Spirit" (Doctrine and Covenants, 25:7).
- 1831: The practice of polygamy was established in the Latter Day Saint movement, potentially as early as 1831.
- 1838: In this year, according to Tenrikyo's doctrine, Nakayama Miki was settled as the Shrine of Tsukihi and the Tenrikyo teachings were founded.
- 1842: Emma Hale Smith became the first president of the Woman's Organization known as the Relief Society for the Church of Jesus Christ of Latter Day Saints in 1842.
- 1843: Women were first included in Mormon prayer circles on September 28, 1843.
- 1844: Elizabeth Peabody became the first person to translate any Buddhist scripture into English, translating a chapter of the Lotus Sutra from its French translation.
- 1845: Rabbis attending the Frankfort Synod of the emerging Reform Judaism declared that women count in a minyan, a formalization of a customary Reform practice dating back to 1811.
- 1848: The Conference of Badasht was held that set in motion the public existence and promulgation of the Bábí religion. Around eighty men and Táhirih attended the conference. The conference is considered by Bábís and Bahá'ís as a signal moment that demonstrated that Islamic Sharia law had been abrogated and superseded by Bábí law, as well as a key demonstration of the thrust of raising the social position of women.
- 1853: Antoinette Brown Blackwell was the first woman ordained as a minister in the United States. She was ordained by a church belonging to the Congregationalist Church. However, her ordination was not recognized by the denomination. She later quit the church and became a Unitarian. The Congregationalists later merged with others to create the United Church of Christ, which ordains women.
- 1861: Women were appointed as deaconesses in the Church of England from 1861, but they could not function fully as deacons and were not considered ordained clergy.
- 1861: Mary A. Will was the first woman ordained in the Wesleyan Methodist Connection by the Illinois Conference in the United States. The Wesleyan Methodist Connection eventually became the Wesleyan Church.
- 1863:
- The Seventh-day Adventist Church was founded; one of its founders was a woman, Ellen G. White.
- Olympia Brown was ordained by the Universalist denomination in 1863, the first woman ordained by that denomination, in spite of a last-moment case of cold feet by her seminary which feared adverse publicity. After a decade and a half of service as a full-time minister, she became a part-time minister in order to devote more time to the fight for women's rights and universal suffrage. In 1961, the Universalists and Unitarians joined to form the Unitarian Universalist Association (UUA). The UUA became the first large denomination to have a majority of female ministers.
- 1865: The Salvation Army was founded, which in the English Methodist tradition always ordained both men and women. However, there were initially rules that prohibited a woman from marrying a man who had a lower rank.
- 1866: Helenor M. Davison was ordained as a deacon by the North Indiana Conference of the Methodist Protestant Church, probably making her the first ordained woman in the Methodist tradition.
- 1866: Margaret Newton Van Cott becomes the first woman to be licensed to preach in The Methodist Episcopal Church.
- 1868: Female Shinto priests were largely pushed out of their positions in 1868.
- 1869:
- Margaret Newton Van Cott became the first woman in the Methodist Episcopal Church to receive a local preacher's license.
- Lydia Sexton (of the United Brethren Church) was appointed chaplain of the Kansas State Prison at the age of 70, the first woman in the United States to hold such a position.
- 1871: Celia Burleigh became the first female Unitarian minister.
- 1872: The Japanese government issued an edict (May 4, 1872, Grand Council of State Edict 98) stating, "Any remaining practices of female exclusion on shrine and temple lands shall be immediately abolished, and mountain climbing for the purpose of worship, etc., shall be permitted". However, women in Japan today do not have complete access to all such places.
- 1873: Unitarian minister Martha Turner (1839–1915) became the first female minister in Australia.
- 1876:
- Anna Oliver became the first woman to graduate from a Methodist seminary, receiving a Bachelor of Divinity from Boston University School of Theology.
- Julia Evelina Smith's 1876 Bible translation, titled The Holy Bible: Containing the Old and New Testaments; Translated Literally from the Original Tongues, is considered the first complete translation of the Bible into English by a woman.
- 1879: The Church of Christ, Scientist was founded by a woman, Mary Baker Eddy.
- 1880: Anna Howard Shaw was the first woman ordained in the Methodist Protestant Church, an American church which later merged with other denominations to form the United Methodist Church.
- Madame Blavatsky and Colonel Olcott became the first Westerners to receive the refuges and precepts, the ceremony by which one traditionally becomes a Buddhist; thus Blavatsky was the first Western woman to do so.
- 1884: Marion Macfarlane became the first woman to be ordained in the Anglican Church in Australia, when she was ordained to the "Female Diaconate" in 1884 in the Diocese of Melbourne.
- 1884: Julie Rosewald, called "Cantor Soprano" by her congregation, became America's first female cantor, serving San Francisco's Temple Emanu-El from 1884 until 1893, although she was not ordained. She was born in Germany.
- 1886: Louise "Lulu" Fleming became the first black woman to be commissioned for career missionary service by the Women's Baptist Foreign Missionary Society of the West.
- 1888:
- Sarah E. Gorham became the first woman missionary of the African Methodist Episcopal Church appointed to a foreign field.
- Fidelia Gillette may have been the first ordained woman in Canada. She served the Universalist congregation in Bloomfield, Ontario, during 1888 and 1889. She was presumably ordained in 1888 or earlier.
- 1889:
- The Nolin Presbytery of the Cumberland Presbyterian Church ordained Louisa Woosley as the first female minister of the Cumberland Presbyterian Church, USA.
- Ella Niswonger was the first woman ordained in the American United Brethren Church, which later merged with other denominations to form the American United Methodist Church, which has ordained women with full clergy rights and conference membership since 1956.
- 1890: On September 14, 1890, Ray Frank gave the Rosh Hashanah sermon for a community in Spokane, Washington, thus becoming the first woman to preach from a synagogue pulpit, although she was not a rabbi.
- The president of the Church of Jesus Christ of Latter-day Saints (LDS Church), Wilford Woodruff, recorded a revelation, known as the "Manifesto", that stopped the practice of polygamy in the church. Following the Manifesto, many groups and individuals left the LDS Church in order to continue the practice; however, these groups have no affiliation with the church today.
- 1892: Anna Hanscombe is believed to be the first woman ordained by the parent bodies which formed the Church of the Nazarene in 1919.
- 1894: Julia A. J. Foote was the first woman to be ordained as a deacon by the African Methodist Episcopal Zion Church.

=== Early 20th century ===
- 1907: Anna Alexander of the Episcopal Diocese of Georgia became the first (and only ever) African-American deaconess in the Episcopal Church.
- 1909:
- The Church of God (Cleveland, Tennessee) began ordaining women in 1909.
- Women were first elected to the procurer of the Bahá'í Local Spiritual Assembly of Chicago – the Bahai Temple Unity. Of the nine members elected by secret ballot three were women with Corinne True (later appointed as a Hand of the Cause) serving as an officer.
- 1911:
- Ann Allebach was the first Mennonite woman to be ordained. This occurred at the First Mennonite Church of Philadelphia.
- St. Joan's International Alliance, founded in 1911, was the first Catholic group to work for women being ordained as priests.
- 1912: Olive Winchester, born in America, became the first woman ordained by any trinitarian Christian denomination in the United Kingdom when she was ordained by the Church of the Nazarene.
- 1914: The Assemblies of God was founded and ordained its first woman pastors in 1914.
- 1917:
- The Church of England appointed female "bishop's messengers" to preach, teach, and take missions in the absence of men.
- The Congregationalist Church (England and Wales) ordained their first woman, Constance Coltman (née Todd), at the King's Weigh House, London. Its successor is the United Reformed Church (a union of the Congregational Church in England and Wales and the Presbyterian Church of England in 1972). Since then two more denominations have joined the union: The Reformed Churches of Christ (1982) and the Congregational Church of Scotland (2000). All of these denominations ordained women at the time of Union and continue to do so. The first woman to be appointed General Secretary of the United Reformed Church was Roberta Rominger in 2008.
- 1918: Alma Bridwell White, head of the Pillar of Fire Church, became the first woman ordained as a bishop in the United States.
- Rosa Gutknecht and Elise Pfister from Switzerland became the first two women in Europe to be ordained as pastors.
- 1920: The Methodist Episcopal Church granted women the right to become licensed as local preachers.
- 1920s: Some Baptist denominations started ordaining women.
- 1921: Helen Barrett Montgomery became the first woman to be elected president of the Northern Baptist Convention (NBC), and of any religious denomination in the United States.
- 1922:
- The Jewish Reform movement's Central Conference of American Rabbis stated that "...woman cannot justly be denied the privilege of ordination." However, the first woman in Reform Judaism to be ordained (Sally Priesand) was not ordained until 1972.
- The American rabbi Mordecai M. Kaplan held the first public celebration of a bat mitzvah in the United States, for his daughter Judith, on March 18, 1922, at the Society for the Advancement of Judaism, his synagogue in New York City. Judith Kaplan recited the preliminary blessing, read a portion of that week's Torah portion in Hebrew and English, and then intoned the closing blessing. Kaplan, who at that time claimed to be an Orthodox rabbi, joined Conservative Judaism and then became the founder of Reconstructionist Judaism, influenced Jews from all branches of non-Orthodox Judaism, through his position at the Jewish Theological Seminary of America. At the time, most Orthodox rabbis strongly rejected the idea of a bat mitzvah ceremony.
- The Annual Conference of the Church of the Brethren granted women the right to be licensed into the ministry, but not to be ordained with the same status as men.
- The Presbyterian General Assembly of the Presbyterian Church in the United States of America allowed women to be deaconesses.
- 1923:
- The Foursquare Church is an Evangelical Pentecostal Christian denomination founded in 1923 by preacher Aimee Semple McPherson.
- The First World Congress of Jewish Women was held in Vienna, Austria, in May 1923. One of the main resolutions was that: "It appears, therefore, to be the duty of all Jews to co-operate in the social-economic reconstruction of Palestine and to assist in the settlement of Jews in that country."
- 1924:
- The Methodist Episcopal Church granted women limited clergy rights as local elders or deacons, without conference membership.
- Ida B. Robinson founded the Mount Sinai Holy Church of America and became the organization's first presiding bishop and president.
- 1928: A secular law was passed in Thailand banning women's full ordination in Buddhism. However, this law was revoked some time after Varanggana Vanavichayen became the first female monk to be ordained in Thailand in 2002.
- 1929: Izabela Wiłucka-Kowalska was the first woman to be ordained by the Old Catholic Mariavite Church in Poland.
- 1930: The Presbyterian Church in the United States of America ordained its first woman elder, Sarah E. Dickson.
- 1935:
- Regina Jonas was ordained privately by a German rabbi and thus became the first woman to be ordained as a rabbi.
- Women were commissioned as deacons in the Church of Scotland from 1935.
- 1936: Lydia Emelie Gruchy became the first female minister in the United Church of Canada. In 1953, the Reverend Lydia Emelie Grouchy was the first Canadian woman to receive an honorary Doctor of Divinity.
- 1936: Sunya Gladys Pratt was ordained as a Buddhist minister in the Shin Buddhist tradition in Tacoma, Washington.
- 1936: A 1936 Mormon policy forbade women whose husbands were not endowed from receiving their own endowment, whether their husbands were members of the church or not. The ostensible reason for the prohibition was to maintain peace and harmony in the home. Gradually the policy changed, first for women whose husbands were members of the church, and then on 12 February 1986, for all women whose husbands were unendowed providing they have the consent of their husbands.
- 1938: Tehilla Lichtenstein became the first Jewish American woman to serve as the spiritual leader of an ongoing Jewish congregation, although she was not ordained.
- 1939–1945: During the Second World War, women were again allowed to become Shinto priests, to fill the void caused by large numbers of men being enlisted in the military.
- 1940: Maren Sørensen became the first woman to be ordained in Denmark.
- 1944: Florence Li Tim Oi became the first woman to be ordained as an Anglican priest. She was born in Hong Kong, and was ordained in Guandong province in unoccupied China on January 25, 1944, on account of a severe shortage of priests due to World War II. When the war ended, she was forced to relinquish her priesthood, yet she was reinstated as a priest later in 1971 in Hong Kong. "When Hong Kong ordained two further women priests in 1971 (Joyce Bennett and Jane Hwang), Florence Li Tim-Oi was officially recognised as a priest by the diocese." She later moved to Toronto, Canada, and assisted as a priest there from 1983 onwards.
- 1945: Kitamura Sayo founded the "dancing religion", Tenshō Kōtai Jingūkyō.
- 1946: The new Silverman siddur (of Conservative Judaism) changed the traditional words of thanking God for "not making me a woman", instead using words thanking God for "making me a free person."
- 1947:
- The Lutheran Protestant Church started to ordain women as priests.
- The Czechoslovak Hussite Church started to ordain women.
- 1948: The Evangelical Lutheran Church of Denmark started to ordain women.
- 1949:
- The Old Catholic Church (in the U.S.) started to ordain women.
- Women were allowed to preach in the Church of Scotland from 1949.
- Eleanora Figaro became the first black woman to receive the papal honor Pro Ecclesia et Pontifice.
- Élisabeth Schmidt became the first woman to be ordained as a pastor of the Reformed Church of France.

=== Late 20th century ===
==== 1950s ====
- 1950: In August 1950, amidst the success of Dianetics, Hubbard held a demonstration in Los Angeles' Shrine Auditorium where he presented a young woman called Sonya Bianca (a pseudonym) to a large audience including many reporters and photographers as "the world's first Clear." However, despite Hubbard's claim that she had "full and perfect recall of every moment of her life", Bianca proved unable to answer questions from the audience testing her memory and analytical abilities, including the question of the color of Hubbard's tie. Hubbard explained Bianca's failure to display her promised powers of recall to the audience by saying that he had used the word "now" in calling her to the stage, and thus inadvertently froze her in "present time," which blocked her abilities. Later, in the late 1950s, Hubbard would claim that several people had reached the state of Clear by the time he presented Bianca as the world's first; these others, Hubbard said, he had successfully cleared in the late 1940s while working incognito in Hollywood posing as a swami. In 1966, Hubbard declared South African Scientologist John McMaster to be the first true Clear. McMaster left the Sea Org in November 1969, expressing continuing belief in the Scientology techniques, but disapproval of the way Scientology was managed.
- 1951: From 1951 until 1953, Paula Ackerman served as Temple Beth Israel's spiritual leader. In so doing, she achieved the distinction of becoming the first woman to assume spiritual leadership of a mainstream American Jewish congregation, although she was never ordained.
- 1955: The Committee on Jewish Law and Standards of the Rabbinical Assembly of Conservative Judaism issued a decision that allowed women to have an aliyah at Torah-reading services.
- 1956:
- Maud K. Jensen was the first woman to receive full clergy rights and conference membership (in her case, in the Central Pennsylvania Conference) in the Methodist Church.
- The Presbyterian Church in the United States of America ordained its first female minister, Margaret Towner.
- 1957: In 1957 the Unity Synod of the Moravian Church declared of women's ordination "in principle such ordination is permissible" and that each province is at liberty to "take such steps as seem essential for the maintenance of the ministry of the Word and Sacraments;" however, while this was approved by the Unity Synod in 1957, the Northern Province of the Moravian Church did not approve women for ordination until 1970 at the Provincial Synod, and it was not until 1975 that Mary Matz became the first female minister within the Moravian Church.
- 1958:
- Women ministers in the Church of the Brethren were given full ordination with the same status as men.
- The Church of Sweden first began to allow female priests in 1958, although none would actually be ordained until 1960.
- 1959:
- The Reverend Gusta A. Robinette, a missionary, was ordained in the Sumatra (Indonesia) Conference soon after the Methodist Church granted full clergy rights to women in 1956. She was appointed District Superintendent of the Medan Chinese District in Indonesia in 1959 becoming the first female district superintendent in the Methodist Church.
- Elisabeth Haseloff became the first female pastor in the Lutheran Church of Germany.

==== 1960s ====
- 1960: The Church of Sweden started ordaining women as priests.
- 1961: Ingrid Bjerkås became the first woman to be ordained a minister of the Church of Norway.
- 1964: Addie Elizabeth Davis became the first Southern Baptist woman to be ordained. However, the Southern Baptist Convention stopped ordaining women in 2000, although existing female pastors are allowed to continue their jobs.
- 1965: Rachel Henderlite became the first woman ordained in the Presbyterian Church in the United States; she was ordained by the Hanover Presbytery in Virginia.
- 1966: Woman elders were introduced in 1966 in the Church of Scotland.
- Freda Bedi, a British woman, became the first Western woman to take ordination in Tibetan Buddhism.
- 1967:
- The Presbyterian Church in Canada started ordaining women.
- Margaret Henrichsen became the first American female district superintendent in the Methodist Church.
- Aside from the years starting in 1967 until 1978 women have been allowed to pray in Mormon sacrament meetings.
- 1968: Women ministers were introduced in the Church of Scotland in 1968.
- 1969: The common identification of Mary Magdalene with other New Testament figures was rejected in the 1969 revision of the General Roman Calendar, with the comment regarding her liturgical celebration on 22 July: "No change has been made in the title of today's memorial, but it concerns only Saint Mary Magdalene, to whom Christ appeared after his resurrection. It is not about the sister of Saint Martha, nor about the sinful woman whose sins the Lord forgave (Luke 7:36–50)." Elsewhere it said of the Roman liturgy of 22 July that "it will make mention neither of Mary of Bethany nor of the sinful woman of Luke 7:36–50, but only of Mary Magdalene, the first person to whom Christ appeared after his resurrection".
- 1969: Rosamund Essex became the first woman to be licensed as a Reader in the Church of England.

==== 1970s ====
- 1970:
- Mate Mahadevi was installed as a jagadguru (spiritual head of the Indian Lingayat community), the first time a woman had been placed in that position.
- The Northern Province of the Moravian Church approved women for ordination in 1970 at the Provincial Synod, but it was not until 1975 that Mary Matz became the first female minister within the Moravian Church.
- In 1963 the Second Vatican Council requested a revision of the rite of the consecration of virgins that was found in the Roman Pontifical; the revised Rite was approved by Pope Paul VI and published in 1970. This consecration can be bestowed either on women in monastic orders or on women living in the world, which revived the form of life that had been found in the early Church.
- On September 27, 1970, St. Teresa of Avila was proclaimed the first female Doctor of the Church by Pope Paul VI.
- On November 22, 1970, Elizabeth Alvina Platz became the first woman ordained by the Lutheran Church in America, and as such was the first woman ordained by any Lutheran denomination in America. The first woman ordained by the American Lutheran Church, Barbara Andrews, was ordained in December 1970. On January 1, 1988 the Lutheran Church in America, the American Lutheran Church, and the Association of Evangelical Lutheran Churches merged to form the Evangelical Lutheran Church in America, which continues to ordain women. (The first woman ordained by the Association of Evangelical Lutheran Churches, Janith Otte, was ordained in 1977.)
- According to statements made in 1995 and later, the underground Catholic bishop Felix Maria Davídek, who was a friend of her family, secretly ordained Ludmila Javorová on December 28, 1970. Historians Fiala and Hanuš conclude that these women he ordained (there were about five, Javorová being the only publicly known) found very few specific sacerdotal tasks in Davídek's group, and conclude from this that their ordinations can therefore be considered as only a "symbolical act and a precedent".
- 1971:
- Venerable Voramai, also called Ta Tao Fa Tzu, became the first fully ordained Thai woman in the Mahayana lineage in Taiwan and turned her family home into a monastery.
- Joyce Bennett and Jane Hwang were the first regularly ordained priests in the Anglican Church in Hong Kong.
- 1972:
- Freda Smith became the first female minister to be ordained by the Metropolitan Community Church.
- Sally Priesand became America's first female rabbi ordained by a rabbinical seminary, and the second formally ordained female rabbi in Jewish history, after Regina Jonas.
- Elizabeth Bailey became the first virgin to be consecrated in England since the 3rd century.
- 1973:
- Freda Smith became the first woman elected to the Metropolitan Community Church's board of elders in 1973, at the fourth general conference in Atlanta, when the board was expanded from four members to seven.
- Emma Sommers Richards became the first Mennonite woman to be ordained as a pastor of a Mennonite congregation (Lombard Mennonite Church in Illinois).
- The Committee on Jewish Law and Standards of Conservative Judaism voted to count women and men equally as members of a minyan.
- 1974:
- The Methodist Church in the United Kingdom started to ordain women again (after a lapse of ordinations).
- Sandy Eisenberg Sasso became the first female rabbi to be ordained in Reconstructionist Judaism.
- Katie Cannon was ordained on April 24, 1974, in Shelby, North Carolina, by the Catawba Presbytery, in the Synod of Catawba, becoming the first African-American woman to be ordained in the United Presbyterian Church (U.S.A.).
- On July 29, 1974, Bishops Daniel Corrigan, Robert L. DeWitt, and Edward R. Welles of the Episcopal Church of the U.S., with Bishop Antonio Ramos of Costa Rica, ordained eleven women as priests in a ceremony that was widely considered "irregular" because the women lacked "recommendation from the standing committee," a canonical prerequisite for ordination. The "Philadelphia Eleven", as they became known, were Merrill Bittner, Alison Cheek, Alla Bozarth (Campell), Emily C. Hewitt, Carter Heyward, Suzanne R. Hiatt, Marie Moorefield, Jeannette Piccard, Betty Bone Schiess, Katrina Welles Swanson, and Nancy Hatch Wittig.
- Auður Eir Vilhjálmsdóttir became the first woman to be ordained into the Evangelical Lutheran Church of Iceland.
- 1975
- The Evangelical Lutheran Church of Latvia decided to ordain women as pastors, although since 1993, under the leadership of Archbishop Janis Vanags, it no longer does so.
- Dorothea W. Harvey became the first woman to be ordained by the Swedenborgian Church.
- Barbara Ostfeld-Horowitz became the first ordained female cantor in Jewish history.
- Mary Matz became the first female minister in the Moravian Church.
- Jackie Tabick, born in Dublin, became the first female rabbi ordained in England.
- George W. Barrett, a bishop of the Episcopal Church of the U.S., ordained four women in an irregular ceremony in Washington, D.C.; these women are known as the Washington Four.
- 1976:
- Michal Mendelsohn (born Michal Bernstein) became the first presiding female rabbi in a North American congregation when she was hired by Temple Beth El Shalom in San Jose, California, in 1976.
- Siddur Nashim: A Sabbath Prayer Book for Women, a siddur written in 1976 by Naomi Janowitz and Margaret Wenig, was the first siddur to use female imagery and pronouns to refer to God.
- The Anglican Church in Canada ordained six female priests.
- Pamela McGee was the first female ordained to the Lutheran ministry in Canada.
- Karuna Dharma became the first fully ordained female member of the Buddhist monastic community in the U.S.
- Episcopal Church laws were changed to permit women's ordination on September 16, 1976.
- Since 1976, the denomination called the Evangelical Covenant Church has ordained and licensed women as ministers.
- 1977:
- On January 1, 1977, Jacqueline Means became the first woman ordained to the priesthood in the Episcopal Church.
- Pauli Murray became the first African American woman to be ordained as an Episcopal priest in 1977.
- The Anglican Church in New Zealand ordained five female priests.
- The first woman ordained by the Association of Evangelical Lutheran Churches, Janith Otte, was ordained in 1977.
- The Unitarian Universalist Association's General Assembly adopted the Women and Religion Resolution, pledging to challenge sexist language, assumptions, and practices.
- 1978:
- Aside from the years starting in 1967 until 1978 women have been allowed to pray in Mormon sacrament meetings.
- Bonnie Koppell became the first female rabbi to serve in the U.S. military.
- Linda Rich became the first female cantor to sing in a Conservative synagogue, specifically Temple Beth Zion in Los Angeles, although she was not ordained.
- Mindy Jacobsen became the first blind woman to be ordained as a cantor in the history of Judaism.
- Lauma Lagzdins Zusevics was ordained as the first woman to serve as a full-time minister for the Latvian Evangelical Lutheran Church in America.
- 1979:
- The Reformed Church in America started ordaining women as ministers. Women had been admitted to the offices of deacon and elder in 1972.
- Linda Joy Holtzman became one of the first women in the United States to serve as the presiding rabbi of a synagogue, when she was hired by Beth Israel Congregation of Chester County, which was then located in Coatesville, Pennsylvania. She had graduated in 1979 from the Reconstructionist Rabbinical College in Philadelphia, yet was hired by Beth Israel despite their being a Conservative congregation. She was thus the first woman to serve as a rabbi for a Conservative congregation, as the Conservative movement did not then ordain women.
- Earlean Miller became the first African-American woman ordained in the Lutheran Church in America (LCA), the largest of three denominations that later combined to form the Evangelical Lutheran Church in America.
- Drisha was founded in 1979 by Rabbi David Silber as the world's first center dedicated specifically to women's study of classical Jewish texts.
- In 1979 Nancy Ledins, born William Griglak, underwent gender reassignment surgery in Trinidad, Colorado. Ledins was previously ordained as a Catholic priest and was not returned to lay status, and is considered by some to be the first official woman priest in the Catholic Church. However, the Catechism of the Catholic Church does clearly state that gender is exclusively binary and every person should "acknowledge and accept his sexual identity." It strongly implies that birth anatomy and gender expression are equal.

==== 1980s ====
- 1980: Marjorie Matthews, at the age of 64, was the first woman elected as a bishop in the United Methodist Church.
- Joan Friedman became the first woman to serve as a rabbi in Canada in 1980, when she was appointed as an Assistant Rabbi at Holy Blossom Temple in Toronto. Her appointment was followed shortly after by that of Elyse Goldstein as Assistant Rabbi from 1983–1986; Goldstein has been noted as the first female rabbi in Canada, but that is incorrect.
- 1981:
- Lynn Gottlieb became the first female rabbi to be ordained in the Jewish Renewal movement.
- Kinneret Shiryon, born in the United States, became the first female rabbi in Israel.
- Ani Pema Chodron is an American woman who was ordained as a bhikkhuni (a fully ordained Buddhist nun) in a lineage of Tibetan Buddhism in 1981. Pema Chödrön was the first American woman to be ordained as a Buddhist nun in the Tibetan Buddhist tradition.
- Karen Soria, born and ordained in the United States, became Australia's first female rabbi.
- 1982:
- Lawmakers in Sweden removed a “conscience clause” allowing Church of Sweden clergy members to refuse to cooperate with female colleagues.
- Nyambura J. Njoroge became the first female ordained minister in the Presbyterian Church of East Africa.
- Edna Moga Ramminger became the first female Lutheran pastor in Brazil.
- 1983:
- An Anglican woman was ordained in Kenya.
- Three Anglican women were ordained in Uganda.
- Rosemarie Köhn became the first woman to be a bishop in the Church of Norway.
- 1984:
- The Southern Baptist Convention adopted a resolution opposing women's ordination in 1984.
- The Community of Christ (known at the time as the Reorganized Church of Jesus Christ of Latter Day Saints) authorized the ordination of women. They are the second largest Latter Day Saint denomination. A schism brought on by this change and others led to the formation of the Restoration Branches movement, the Restoration Church of Jesus Christ of Latter Day Saints and the Remnant Church of Jesus Christ of Latter Day Saints all of which reject female priesthood, although not always the ordination of women in all contexts.
- Leontine Kelly, the first black woman to become a bishop of a major religious denomination in the United States, was elected head of the United Methodist Church in the San Francisco area.
- Dr. Deborah Cohen became the first certified Reform mohelet (female circumciser); she was certified by the Berit Mila program of Reform Judaism.
- The Church of South India, since 1984, has allowed women's ordination.
- From 1984 to 1990 Barbara Borts, born in America, was a rabbi at Radlett Reform Synagogue, making her the first woman rabbi to have a pulpit of her own in a UK Reform Judaism synagogue.
- 1985:
- According to the New York Times for 1985-FEB-14: "After years of debate, the worldwide governing body of Conservative Judaism has decided to admit women as rabbis. The group, the Rabbinical Assembly, plans to announce its decision at a news conference...at the Jewish Theological Seminary...". In 1985 Amy Eilberg became the first female rabbi to be ordained in Conservative Judaism.
- The first women deacons were ordained by the Scottish Episcopal Church.
- Judy Harrow became the first member of CoG (Covenant of the Goddess, a Wiccan group) to be legally registered as clergy in New York City in 1985, after a five-year effort requiring the assistance of the New York Civil Liberties Union.
- 1986: Rabbi Julie Schwartz became the first female Naval chaplain in the U.S.
- A 1936 Mormon policy forbade women whose husbands were not endowed from receiving their own endowment, whether their husbands were members of the church or not. The ostensible reason for the prohibition was to maintain peace and harmony in the home. Gradually the policy changed, first for women whose husbands were members of the church, and then on 12 February 1986, for all women whose husbands were unendowed providing they have the consent of their husbands.
- 1987:
- Chandanaji became the first Jain woman to receive the title of Acharya.
- Erica Lippitz and Marla Rosenfeld Barugel became the first female cantors in Conservative Judaism.
- Joy Levitt became the first female president of the Reconstructionist Rabbinical Association.
- The first female deacons were ordained in the Church of England.
- 1988:
- The Evangelical Lutheran Church of Finland started to ordain women.
- Virginia Nagel was ordained as the first deaf female priest in the Episcopal Church.
- Jetsunma Ahkon Lhamo, an American woman formerly called Catharine Burroughs, became the first Western woman to be named a reincarnate lama.
- Barbara Harris was the first woman elected as a bishop of The Episcopal Church, as well as the Anglican Communion.
- 1989: Einat Ramon, ordained in New York, became the first female native-Israeli rabbi.

==== 1990s ====
- 1990:
- Pauline Bebe became the first female rabbi in France, although she was ordained in England.
- Penny Jamieson became the first female Anglican diocesan bishop in the world. She was ordained a bishop of the Anglican Church in New Zealand in June 1990.
- Anglican women were ordained in Ireland. Janet Catterall became the first woman ordained an Anglican priest in Ireland.
- The Church of Ireland began ordaining women to the priesthood. The first two women so ordained were Kathleen Margaret Brown and Irene Templeton.
- Sister Cora Billings was installed as a pastor in Richmond, VA, becoming the first black nun to head a parish in the U.S.
- The Cantors Assembly, an international professional organization of cantors associated with Conservative Judaism, began allowing women to join.
- 1991:
- The Presbyterian Church of Australia ceased ordaining women to the ministry in 1991, but the rights of women ordained prior to this time were not affected.
- The Cooperative Baptist Fellowship, which supports ordaining women, was founded in 1991.
- In 1991, the Kerala High Court restricted entry of women above the age of 10 and below the age of 50 from Sabarimala Shrine as they were of the menstruating age. However, on 28 September 2018, the Supreme Court of India lifted the ban on the entry of women. It said that discrimination against women on any grounds, even religious, is unconstitutional.
- 1992:
- Naamah Kelman, born in the United States, became the first female rabbi ordained in Israel.
- In March 1992 the first female priests in Australia were appointed; they were priests of the Anglican Church in Australia.
- Maria Jepsen became the world's first woman to be elected a Lutheran bishop when she was elected bishop of the North Elbian Evangelical Lutheran Church in Germany, but she resigned in 2010 after allegations that she failed to properly investigate cases of sexual abuse.
- In November 1992 the General Synod of the Church of England approved the ordination of women as priests.
- The Anglican Church of South Africa started to ordain women.
- Rabbi Karen Soria became the first female rabbi to serve in the U.S. Marines, which she did from 1992 until 1996.
- 1993:
- Rebecca Dubowe became the first deaf woman to be ordained as a rabbi in the United States.
- The Communauté Evangélique Mennonite au Congo (Mennonite Evangelical Community of Congo) voted to ordain women as pastors.
- Valerie Stessin became the first female Conservative rabbi to be ordained in Israel.
- Chana Timoner became the first female rabbi to hold an active duty assignment as a chaplain in the U.S. Army.
- Victoria Matthews was the first woman elected as a bishop of the Anglican Church of Canada; however she resigned in 2007, stating that "God is now calling me in a different direction". In 2008, she was ordained as Bishop of Christchurch, becoming the first woman to hold that position.
- Rosemarie Köhn became the first woman to be appointed a bishop in the Church of Norway.
- Leslie Friedlander became the first female cantor ordained by the Academy for Jewish Religion (New York).
- Maya Leibovich became the first native-born female rabbi in Israel.
- Ariel Stone, also called C. Ariel Stone, became the first American Reform rabbi to lead a congregation in the former Soviet Union, and the first liberal rabbi in Ukraine. She worked as a rabbi in Ukraine from 1993 until 1994, leaving her former job at the Temple of Israel in Miami.
- 1994:
- Lia Bass was ordained by the Jewish Theological Seminary in New York, thus becoming the first Latin-American female rabbi in the world as well as the first woman from Brazil to be ordained as a rabbi.
- The first women priests were ordained by the Scottish Episcopal Church.
- Rabbi Laura Geller became the first woman to lead a major metropolitan congregation, specifically Temple Emanuel in Beverly Hills.
- Indrani Rampersad was ordained as the first female Hindu priest in Trinidad.
- On March 12, 1994, the Church of England ordained 32 women as its first female priests.
- Amina Wadud, born in the United States, became the first woman in South Africa to deliver the jum'ah khutbah, at the Claremont Main Road Mosque in Cape Town.
- A circular letter from the Congregation for Divine Worship and the Discipline of the Sacraments to presidents of episcopal conferences on 15 March 1994, announced a 30 June 1992 authentic interpretation (confirmed on 11 July 1992 by Pope John Paul II) from the Pontifical Council for the Interpretation of Legislative Texts. This authentic interpretation said that canon 230 §2 states that service at the altar is one of the liturgical functions that can be performed by both lay men and women. The circular letter, written by the cardinal-prefect of the Congregation, also clarified that canon 230 §2 has a permissive and not a prescriptive character, that is, it allows, but does not require, the use of female altar servers. Thus it is for each diocesan bishop to decide whether to allow them in his diocese.
- 1995:
- The Sligo Seventh-day Adventist Church in Takoma Park, Maryland, ordained three women in violation of the denomination's rules – Kendra Haloviak, Norma Osborn, and Penny Shell.
- The Evangelical Lutheran Church in Denmark ordained its first woman as a bishop.
- Bea Wyler, born in Switzerland, became the second female rabbi in Germany (the first being Regina Jonas), and the first to officiate at a congregation.
- The Christian Reformed Church voted to allow women ministers, elders and evangelists. In 1998, the North American Presbyterian and Reformed Council (NAPARC) suspended the CRC's membership because of this decision.
- In May 1995, Bola Odeleke was the first woman ordained as a bishop in Africa. Specifically, she was ordained in Nigeria.
- Lise-Lotte Rebel became the first female bishop in the Church of Denmark.
- 1996:
- Through the efforts of Sakyadhita, an International Buddhist Women Association, ten Sri Lankan women were ordained as bhikkhunis in Sarnath, India.
- Subhana Barzagi Roshi became the Diamond Sangha's first female roshi (Zen teacher) when she received transmission on March 9, 1996, in Australia. In the ceremony Subhanna also became the first female roshi in the lineage of Robert Aitken Roshi.
- 1997:
- Rosalina Rabaria became the first female priest in the Philippine Independent Church.
- Christina Odenberg became the first woman to be a bishop in the Church of Sweden.
- Chava Koster, born in the Netherlands and ordained in the United States, became the first female rabbi from the Netherlands.
- 1998:
- Nelinda Primavera-Briones was the first woman elected as a bishop of the United Church of Christ in the Philippines (UCCP).
- The General Assembly of the Nippon Sei Ko Kai (Anglican Church in Japan) started to ordain women.
- The Guatemalan Presbyterian Synod started to ordain women.
- The Old Catholic Church in the Netherlands started to ordain women.
- On July 28, 1998, Ava Muhammad became the first female minister in the Nation of Islam, heading Muhammad's Mosque 15 in Atlanta, Ga., one of the largest mosques in the country. In addition to administering day-to-day affairs there she was named Southern Regional Minister, giving her jurisdiction over Nation of Islam mosque activity in Georgia, Alabama, Mississippi, and parts of Tennessee.
- Some Orthodox Jewish congregations started to employ women as congregational interns, a job created for learned Orthodox Jewish women. Although these interns do not lead worship services, they perform some tasks usually reserved for rabbis, such as preaching, teaching, and consulting on Jewish legal matters. The first woman hired as a congregational intern was Julie Stern Joseph, hired in 1998 by the Lincoln Square Synagogue of the Upper West Side.
- Nelly Shulman, born in Russia and ordained in England, became the first female rabbi from Russia and the first female rabbi in Belarus, serving as the chief reform rabbi of Minsk, Belarus.
- Sherry Chayat, born in Brooklyn, became the first American woman to receive transmission in the Rinzai school of Buddhism.
- In 1998 Kay Ward became the first woman to be a bishop in the Moravian Church.
- After 900 years without such ordinations, Sri Lanka again began to ordain women as fully ordained Buddhist nuns, called bhikkhunis.
- Gail E. Mengel and Linda L. Booth became the first two women apostles in the Community of Christ.
- The Baptist Faith and Message was amended in 1998 to declare "a wife is to submit herself graciously" to her husband.
- 1999:
- Women first began administering baptism, serving as deacons, and leading services in the Evangelical Church of the Augsburg Confession in Poland.
- The First Satanic Church was founded by Karla LaVey in 1999 in San Francisco, California.
- The Independent Presbyterian Church of Brazil allowed the ordination of women as either clergy or elders.
- The Unitarian Universalist Association (UUA) became the first large denomination to have a majority of female ministers.
- Beth Lockard was ordained as the first deaf pastor in the Evangelical Lutheran Church in America.
- The first woman to become a bishop of the Czechoslovak-Hussite church, Jana Šilerová, was elected to a 7-year term of office in April 1999.
- Tamara Kolton became the first rabbi of either sex (and therefore, because she was female, the first female rabbi) to be ordained in Humanistic Judaism.
- Katalin Kelemen, born in Hungary but ordained at Leo Baeck College in England, was inducted as the rabbi of the Sim Shalom Progressive Jewish Congregation in Budapest, Hungary, thus becoming the first female rabbi in Hungary.
- Angela Warnick Buchdahl, born in Seoul, Korea, became the first Asian-American person to be ordained as a cantor in the world when she was ordained by HUC-JIR, an American seminary for Reform Judaism.
- The Anglican Diocese of The Bahamas and the Turks and Caicos Islands ordained Angela Palacious as the first Bahamian woman deacon.

=== 21st century ===
==== 2000s ====
- 2000:
- The Baptist Union of Scotland voted to allow their individual churches to make local decisions as to whether to allow or prohibit the ordination of women.
- The Baptist Faith and Message was amended in 2000 to state, "While both men and women are gifted for service in the church, the office of pastor is limited to men as qualified by Scripture."
- The Mennonite Brethren Church of Congo ordained its first female pastor in 2000.
- Helga Newmark, born in Germany, became the first female Holocaust survivor ordained as a rabbi. She was ordained in America.
- In July 2000 Vashti McKenzie was the first woman elected as a bishop in the African Methodist Episcopal (AME) Church.
- The Lutheran Evangelical Protestant Church (GCEPC) has ordained women since its inception in the year 2000.
- The Mombasa diocese of the Anglican Church in Kenya began to ordain women.
- The Church of Pakistan ordained its first female deacons. It is a united church which dates back to the 1970 local merger of Anglicans, Methodists, Presbyterians, Lutherans and other Protestant denominations.
- The Anglican Diocese of The Bahamas and the Turks and Caicos Islands ordained Angela Palacious, who had been the first Bahamian woman deacon, as the first woman priest.
- 2001:

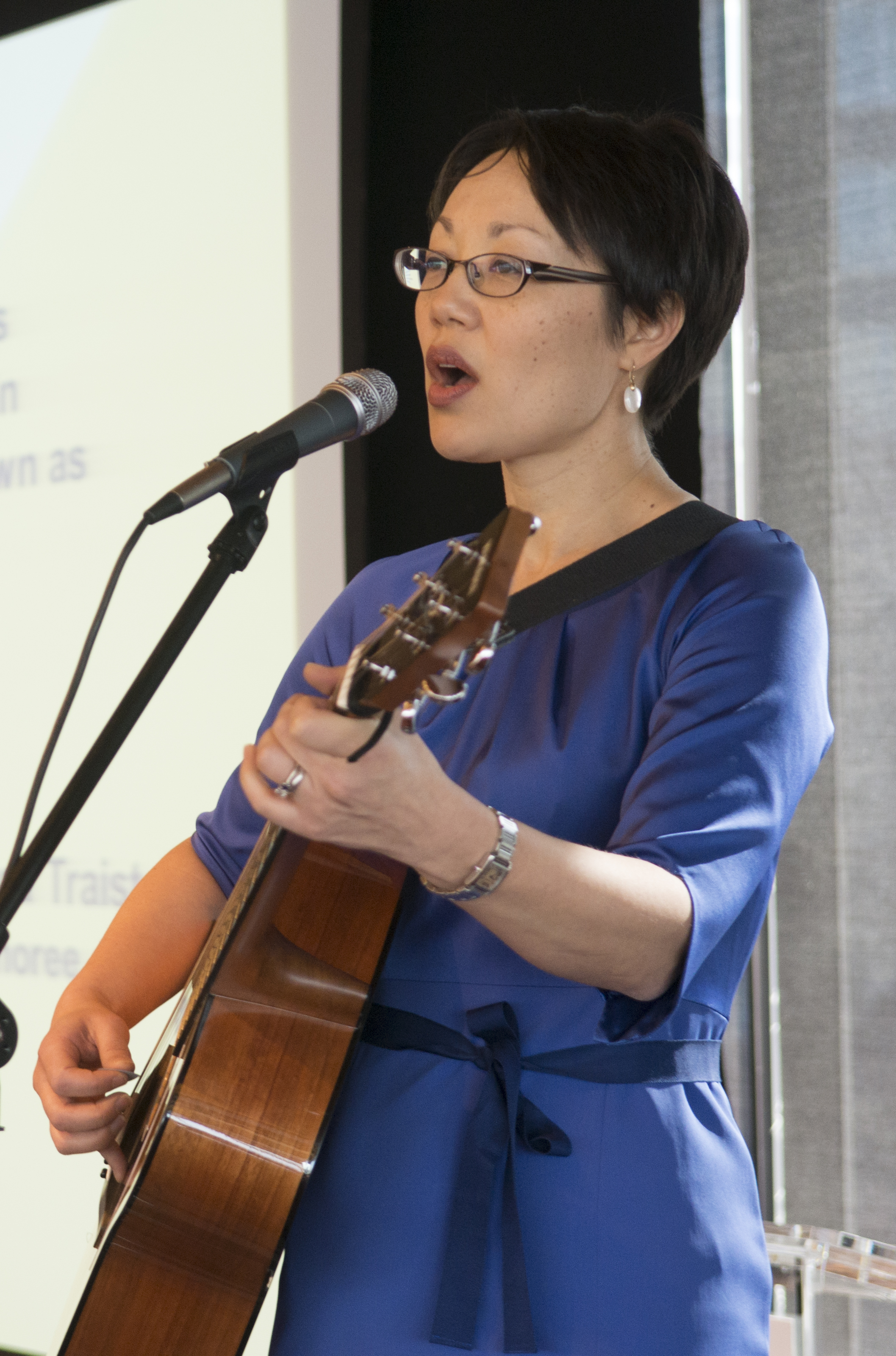
Rabbi Angela Warnick Buchdahl

- Women in Japan were forbidden from participation in Yamakasa, parades in which Shinto shrines are carried through a town, until 2001.
- Angela Warnick Buchdahl, born in Seoul, Korea, became the first Asian-American person to be ordained as a rabbi in the world; she was ordained by HUC-JIR, an American seminary for Reform Judaism.
- Eveline Goodman-Thau became the first female rabbi in Austria; she was born in Austria but ordained in Jerusalem.
- Deborah Davis became the first cantor of either sex (and therefore, since she was female, the first female cantor) in Humanistic Judaism; however, Humanistic Judaism has since stopped graduating cantors.
- Brigitte Boehme became the first female president of the Evangelical Church of Bremen.
- Bärbel Wartenberg-Potter became bishop of Evangelical Lutheran Church in Northern Germany.
- The first translation of the Qur'an into English by a woman (and the first bilingual translation of the Qur'an, done in Persian and English) was done in 2001 by an Iranian woman, Tahereh Saffarzadeh.
- A Catholic document, from 2001, made clear that, even if a bishop decided to permit female altar servers, the priest in charge of a church in that diocese was not obliged to accept them, since there was no question of anyone, male or female, having a right to become an altar server. Furthermore, the document states that: it will always be very appropriate to follow the noble tradition of having boys serve at the altar.
- 2002:
- Suzan Johnson Cook became the first woman elected president of the Hampton University Ministers' Conference, a conference which represents all of the historically African-American denominations.
- Sharon Hordes became the very first cantor in Reconstructionist Judaism. Therefore, since she was a woman, she became their first female cantor.
- Avitall Gerstetter became the first female cantor in Jewish Renewal and the first female cantor in Germany.
- The Danube Seven (Christine Mayr-Lumetzberger, Adelinde Theresia Roitinger, Gisela Forster, Iris Muller, Ida Raming, Pia Brunner and Angela White), a group of seven women from Germany, Austria, and the United States, were ordained on a ship on the Danube on 29 June 2002 by Rómulo Antonio Braschi, an Independent Catholic bishop whose own episcopal ordination was considered 'valid but illicit' by the Roman Catholic Church. The women's ordinations were not, however, recognised as being valid by the Roman Catholic Church. As a consequence of this violation of canon law and their refusal to repent, the women were excommunicated in 2003. Since then several similar actions have been held by Roman Catholic Womenpriests, a group in favor of women's ordination in Roman Catholicism; this was the first such action.
- Khenmo Drolma, an American woman, became the first bhikkhuni (fully ordained Buddhist nun) in the Drikung Kagyu lineage of Buddhism, traveling to Taiwan to be ordained.
- A 55-year-old Buddhist nun, Varanggana Vanavichayen, became the first female monk to be ordained in Thailand. She was ordained by a Sri Lankan woman monk in the presence of a male Thai monk. Theravada scriptures, as interpreted in Thailand, require that for a woman to be ordained as a monk, the ceremony must be attended by both a male and female monk. Some time after this a secular law in Thailand banning women's full ordination in Buddhism which had been passed in 1928 was revoked.
- Jacqueline Mates-Muchin was ordained by Hebrew Union College-Jewish Institute of Religion in New York, and thus became the first Chinese-American rabbi.
- The Committee on Jewish Law and Standards adapted a responsum by Rabbi David Fine which provides an official religious-law foundation for women counting in a minyan and explains the current Conservative approach to the role of women in prayer. This responsum holds that although Jewish women do not traditionally have the same obligations as men, Conservative women have, as a collective whole, voluntarily undertaken them. Because of this collective undertaking, the Fine responsum holds that Conservative women are eligible to serve as agents and decision-makers for others. The responsum also holds that traditionally-minded communities and individual women can opt out without being regarded by the Conservative movement as sinning. By adopting this responsum, the CJLS found itself in a position to provide a considered Jewish-law justification for its egalitarian practices, without having to rely on potentially unconvincing arguments, undermine the religious importance of community and clergy, ask individual women intrusive questions, repudiate the halakhic tradition, or label women following traditional practices as sinners.
- 2003:
- Ayya Sudhamma Bhikkhuni became the first American-born woman to gain bhikkhuni ordination in the Theravada school in Sri Lanka.
- Sarah Schechter became the first female rabbi in the U.S. Air Force.
- Sandra Kochmann, born in Paraguay, became the first female rabbi in Brazil.
- Born in Canada and educated in England, Nancy Morris became Scotland's first female rabbi in 2003.
- Rabbi Janet Marder was named the first female president of the Reform Movement's Central Conference of American Rabbis (CCAR) on March 26, 2003, making her the first woman to lead a major rabbinical organization and the first woman to lead any major Jewish co-ed religious organization in the United States.
- On February 28, 2003, Dhammananda Bhikkhuni, formerly known as Chatsumarn Kabilsingh, became the first Thai woman to receive full ordination as a Theravada nun. She was ordained in Sri Lanka.
- Sivan Malkin Maas became the first Israeli to be ordained as a rabbi in Humanistic Judaism; she was ordained by the International Institute for Secular Humanistic Judaism in 2003.
- Canadian Aviel Barclay became the world's first known traditionally trained female sofer.
- In the summer of 2003, two of the Danube Seven, Christine Mayr-Lumetzberger (from Austria) and Gisela Forster (from Germany), were ordained as bishops by several male bishops of independent churches not affiliated with the Vatican. These ordinations were done in secret and are not recognized as valid by the Roman Catholic Church. At the death of the male bishops, their identities will be revealed. Since then several similar actions have been held by Roman Catholic Womenpriests, a group in favor of women's ordination in Roman Catholicism; this was the first such action for women being ordained bishops.
- Saccavadi and Gunasari were ordained as bhikkhunis in Sri Lanka, thus becoming the first female Burmese novices in modern times to receive higher ordination in Sri Lanka.
- Alison Elliot was elected the first woman moderator of the General Assembly of the Church of Scotland. She chaired the General Assembly the following year.
- 2004:
- Khenmo Drolma, an American woman, became the first westerner of either sex to be installed as an abbot in the Drikung Kagyu lineage of Buddhism, being installed as the abbot of the Vajra Dakini Nunnery in Vermont (America's first Tibetan Buddhist nunnery) in 2004.
- Barbara Aiello, born and ordained in the United States, became the first female rabbi in Italy.
- In Canada, Yasmin Shadeer led the night 'Isha prayer for a mixed-gender (men as well as women praying and hearing the sermon) congregation. This is the first recorded occasion in modern times where a woman led a congregation in prayer in a mosque.
- Genevieve Benay (from France), Michele Birch-Conery (from Canada), Astride Indrican (from Latvia), Victoria Rue (from the USA), Jane Via (from the USA), and Monika Wyss (from Switzerland) were ordained as deacons on a ship in the Danube. The women's ordinations were not, however, recognised as being valid by the Roman Catholic Church. As a consequence of this violation of canon law and their refusal to repent, the women were excommunicated. Since then several similar actions have been held by Roman Catholic Womenpriests, a group in favor of women's ordination in Roman Catholicism; this was the first such action for female deacons.
- Maria Pap was elected to the position of district dean in the Unitarian Church of Transylvania, the highest post ever held by a woman in that Church.
- 2005:
- The Lutheran Evangelical Protestant Church, (LEPC) (GCEPC) in the USA elected Nancy Kinard Drew as its first female Presiding Bishop.
- Annalu Waller, who had cerebral palsy, was ordained as the first disabled female priest in the Scottish Episcopal Church.
- Floriane Chinsky, born in Paris and ordained in Jerusalem, became Belgium's first female rabbi.
- In April 2005, Raheel Raza, born in Pakistan, led Toronto's first woman-led mixed-gender Friday prayer service, delivering the sermon and leading the prayers of the mixed-gender congregation organized by the Muslim Canadian Congress to celebrate Earth Day in the backyard of the downtown Toronto home of activist Tarek Fatah.
- On July 1, 2005, Pamela Taylor, a Muslim convert since 1986, became the first woman to lead Friday prayers in a Canadian mosque, and did so for a congregation of both men and women. Pamela Taylor is an American convert to Islam and co-chair of the New York-based Progressive Muslim Union. In addition to leading the prayers, Taylor also gave a sermon on the importance of equality among people regardless of gender, race, sexual orientation and disability.
- Elisa Klapheck, born in Germany, became the first female rabbi in the Netherlands.
- Nancy Wilson was elected Moderator of the international Metropolitan Community Churches, thus making her the second person, and the first woman, to serve in that role since the Metropolitan Community Church's founding.
- Rola Sleiman became Lebanon's first officially appointed female pastor.
- 2006:
- Susan Wehle became the first American female cantor in Jewish Renewal in 2006; however, she died in 2009.
- The Episcopal Church elected Katharine Jefferts Schori as its first female Presiding Bishop, or Primate.
- Merle Kodo Boyd, born in Texas, became the first African-American woman ever to receive Dharma transmission in Zen Buddhism.
- The Tamil Evangelical Lutheran Church ordained its first six female pastors.
- Sharon Ballantyne was ordained as the first blind minister in the United Church of Canada.
- The Committee on Jewish Law and Standards adopted three responsa on the subject of niddah, which reaffirmed an obligation of Conservative Jewish women to abstain from sexual relations during and following menstruation and to immerse in a mikvah prior to resumption, while liberalizing observance requirements including shortening the length of the niddah period, lifting restrictions on non-sexual contact during niddah, and reducing the circumstances under which spotting and similar conditions would mandate abstinence.
- Dina Najman became the first Orthodox woman appointed as rabbinic leader of a synagogue, when she became the Rosh Kehilah of Kehilat Orach Eliezer in Manhattan, New York.
- 2007:
- The Worldwide Church of God, a denomination with about 860 congregations worldwide, decided to allow women to serve as pastors and elders. This decision was reached after several years of study. Debby Bailey became the first female elder in the Worldwide Church of God in 2007.
- The current Dalai Lama stated that the next Dalai Lama could possibly be a woman, remarking "If a woman reveals herself as more useful the lama could very well be reincarnated in this form".
- Susan Johnson became the first female national bishop in the Evangelical Lutheran Church in Canada.
- Tanya Segal, born in Russia and ordained in Jerusalem, became the first full-time female rabbi in Poland.
- Jen Taylor Friedman, a British woman, became the first female sofer to scribe a Sefer Torah.
- Nerva Cot Aguilera became the first woman to be a bishop in Latin America, as the bishop of the Episcopal Church of Cuba.
- The synod of the Christian Reformed Church voted 112–70 to allow any Christian Reformed Church congregation that wishes to do so to ordain women as ministers, elders, deacons and/or ministry associates; since 1995, congregations and regional church bodies called "classes" already had the option of ordaining women, and 26 of the 47 classes had exercised it before the vote in June.
- Myokei Caine-Barrett, born and ordained in Japan, became the first female Nichiren priest in her affiliated Nichiren Order of North America.
- Becky L. Savage was ordained as the first woman to serve in the First Presidency of the Community of Christ.
- Laleh Bakhtiar's translation of the Qur'an, first published in 2007 and called The Sublime Quran, was the first translation of the Qur'an by an American woman.
- 2008:
- Mildred "Bonnie" Hines was the first woman elected as a bishop in the African Methodist Episcopal Zion Church.
- The Revd Joaquina Filipe Nhanala was elected to oversee the Mozambique area for the United Methodist Church, thus becoming the first female United Methodist bishop in Africa.
- Kay Goldsworthy became the first woman to be a bishop in the Anglican Church in Australia.
- On 17 October 2008, Amina Wadud, born in the United States, became the first woman to lead a mixed-gender congregation in prayer in the United Kingdom when she performed the Friday prayers at Oxford's Wolfson College.
- After a 10-year process of advanced training culminating in a ceremony called shitsugo (literally "room-name"), Sherry Chayat received the title of roshi and the name Shinge ("Heart/Mind Flowering") from Eido Roshi, which was the first time that this ceremony was held in the United States.
- Rabbi Julie Schonfeld was named the new executive vice president of the Conservative movement's Rabbinical Assembly, becoming the first female rabbi to serve in the chief executive position of an American rabbinical association.
- 2009:
- The first Bhikkhuni ordination in Australia in the Theravada Buddhist tradition was performed in Perth, Australia, on 22 October 2009 at Bodhinyana Monastery. Abbess Vayama together with Venerables Nirodha, Seri, and Hasapanna were ordained as Bhikkhunis by a dual Sangha act of Bhikkhus and Bhikkhunis in full accordance with the Pali Vinaya.
- Karen Soria became the first female rabbi in the Canadian Forces; she was assigned to 3 Canadian Forces Flying Training School in Portage la Prairie, Manitoba.
- The Evangelical Church in Germany (EKD) elected Margot Käßmann as its first female Presiding Bishop, or Primate; she received 132 out of 142 votes. However, she chose to resign in 2010, after she was caught drink driving, although the Council of the EKD judged unanimously that it was not grounds for a resignation.
- Alysa Stanton, born in Cleveland and ordained by a Reform Jewish seminary in Cincinnati, became the world's first black female rabbi.
- Lynn Feinberg became the first female rabbi in Norway, where she was born.
- Jana Jeruma-Grinberga became Britain's first woman to be a bishop in a mainstream British church, the Lutheran Church in Great Britain.
- Tannoz Bahremand Foruzanfar, who was born in Iran, became the first Persian woman to be ordained as a cantor in the United States.
- Ilse Junkermann was the first woman to become a bishop of the Evangelical Church in Central Germany.
- Guillermina Chaparro became the first female president of the Evangelical Lutheran Church in Venezuela.
- Wu Chengzhen became the first woman to be a Fangzhang (principal abbess) in the history of Taoism.
- Eva Brunne became the bishop of Stockholm and Tuulikki Koivunen Bylund became bishop of Härnösands, in the Church of Sweden.
- On July 19, 2009, 11 women received semicha (ordination) as kohanot from the Kohenet Hebrew Priestess Institute, based at the Isabella Freedman Jewish Retreat Center, becoming their first priestess ordainees.
- Sheikh Taysir Tamimi appointed the Palestinian territories' first two female Islamic court judges.
- In 2009, for the first time women (and ethnic minorities and people living overseas) were officially recognized as being descendants of Confucius.

==== 2010s ====
- 2010:
- Irja Askola (of the Diocese of Helsinki) became the first woman to be elected as a bishop of the Evangelical Lutheran Church of Finland.
- Sara Hurwitz, an Orthodox Jewish woman born in South Africa, was given the title of "rabbah" (sometimes spelled "rabba"), the feminine form of rabbi. As such, she is considered by some to be the first female Orthodox rabbi.
- The Soto Zen Buddhist Association (SZBA) approved a document honoring the women ancestors in the Zen tradition at its biannual meeting on October 8, 2010. Female ancestors, dating back 2,500 years from India, China, and Japan, could thus be included in the curriculum, ritual, and training offered to Western Zen students.
- For the first time in the history of the Church of England, more women than men were ordained as priests (290 women and 273 men).
- The first American women to be ordained as cantors in Jewish Renewal after Susan Wehle's ordination were Michal Rubin and Abbe Lyons, both ordained on January 10, 2010.
- The International Rabbinic Fellowship, a fellowship of about 150 Orthodox rabbis, adopted a resolution stating that properly trained Orthodox Jewish women should have the opportunity to serve as "teachers of Torah", "persons who can answer questions and provide guidance to both men and women in all areas of Jewish law in which they are well-versed", "clergy who function as pastoral counselors", "spiritual preachers and guides who teach classes and deliver divrei Torah and derashot, in the synagogue and out, both during the week and on Shabbatot and holidays", "spiritual guides and mentors helping arrange and managing life-cycle events such as weddings, bar- and bat-mitzvah celebrations and funerals, while refraining from engaging in those aspects of these events that Halakha does not allow for women to take part in" and "presidents and full members of the boards of synagogues and other Torah institutions"; the resolution does not, however, mention whether these women should or can be ordained or what titles they can hold.
- In 2010, at the Orthodox Jewish synagogue Hebrew Institute of Riverdale, Lamelle Ryman led a Friday-night service as a cantor would. No other Orthodox synagogue in the U.S. had ever before had a woman lead a Kabbalat Shabbat service, although Orthodox institutions like the Darkhei Noam prayer group in New York and the Shira Hadasha congregation in Jerusalem already did have women leading Kabbalat Shabbat. In addition, there had been a female-led Kabbalat Shabbat in a Washington Heights apartment in Manhattan — most of the worshippers came from the Yeshiva University community — in 1987 that drew little attention or opposition. In any case, Lamelle Ryan was not ordained as a cantor, and as of 2010 Orthodox Judaism does not ordain women as cantors.
- Alina Treiger, born in Ukraine, became the first female rabbi to be ordained in Germany since World War II (the very first female rabbi ordained in Germany was Regina Jonas, ordained in 1935).
- The first Sefer Torah scribed by a group of women (six female sofers, who were from Brazil, Canada, Israel, and the United States) was completed; this was known as the Women's Torah Project.
- The first Tibetan Buddhist nunnery in America (Vajra Dakini Nunnery in Vermont), offering novice ordination in the Drikung Kagyu lineage of Buddhism, was officially consecrated.
- Teresa E. Snorton was the first woman elected as a bishop in the Christian Methodist Episcopal Church.
- In Northern California, 4 novice nuns were given the full bhikkhuni ordination in the Thai Therevada tradition, which included the double ordination ceremony. Bhante Gunaratana and other monks and nuns were in attendance. It was the first such ordination ever in the Western hemisphere. The following month, more full ordinations were completed in Southern California, led by Walpola Piyananda and other monks and nuns. The bhikkhunis ordained in Southern California were Lakshapathiye Samadhi (born in Sri Lanka), Cariyapanna, Susila, Sammasati (all three born in Vietnam), and Uttamanyana (born in Myanmar).
- Raheel Raza, born in Pakistan, became the first Muslim-born woman to lead a mixed-gender British congregation through Friday prayers.
- Delegates of the Fellowship of the Middle East Evangelical Churches unanimously voted in favor of a statement supporting the ordination of women as pastors, during their Sixth General Assembly. An English translation of the statement reads, "The Sixth General Assembly supports the ordination of the women in our churches in the position of ordained pastor and her partnership with men as an equal partner in decision making. Therefore we call on member churches to take leading steps in this concern."
- With the October 16, 2010, ordination of Margaret Lee, in the Peoria-based Diocese of Quincy, Illinois, women have been ordained as priests in all 110 dioceses of the Episcopal Church in the United States.
- 2011:
- Kirsten Eistrup, 55, became the first female priest in the Danish Seamen's Church in Singapore. She was also the Lutheran Protestant Church's first female pastor in Asia.
- Kirsten Fehrs became the first woman to be a bishop in the North Elbian Evangelical Lutheran Church.
- Annette Kurschus became the first woman to be a praeses of the Evangelical Church of Westphalia.
- Sandra Kviat became the first woman from Denmark to be a rabbi; she was ordained in England.
- Antje Deusel was ordained by Abraham Geiger College, thus becoming the first German-born woman to be ordained as a rabbi in Germany since the Nazi era.
- From October 2010 until spring 2011, Julie Seltzer, one of the female sofers from the Women's Torah Project (see above in 2010), scribed a Sefer Torah as part of an exhibition at the Contemporary Jewish Museum in San Francisco. This makes her the first American female sofer to scribe a Sefer Torah; Julie Seltzer was born in Philadelphia and is non-denominationally Jewish.
- The Tehran Mobeds Anjuman (Anjoman-e-Mobedan) announced that for the first time in the history of Iran and of the Zoroastrian communities worldwide, women had joined the group of mobeds (Zoroastrian priests) in Iran as mobedyars (female Zoroastrian priests); the women hold official certificates and can perform the lower-rung religious functions and can initiate people into the religion.
- Eva Marie Jansvik became the first female priest in the Norwegian Seamen's Church in Singapore.
- One third of the Catholic theology professors in Germany, Austria, and Switzerland (144 people) signed a declaration calling for women's ordination and opposing "traditionalism" in the liturgy.
- Mary Whittaker became the first deaf person to be ordained into the Church of Scotland.
- The Anglican Diocese of Cyprus and the Gulf was allowed to ordain women as priests and appoint them to single charge chaplaincies. On June 5, 2011, Catherine Dawkins was ordained by the bishop of the Anglican Diocese of Cyprus and the Gulf, the Right Revd Michael Lewis, during a ceremony at St Christopher's Cathedral, Manama. This makes her the first female priest in the Middle East.
- Stella Bentsi-Enchil, Alberta Kennies Addo, and Susanna C. Naana Ackun were ordained as the first female priests of the Anglican Church of Ghana.
- The Evangelical Presbyterian Church's 31st General Assembly voted to allow congregations to call women to ordained ministry, even if their presbytery (governing body) objects for theological or doctrinal reasons. Such congregations will be allowed to leave the objecting presbytery (such as the Central South, which includes Memphis) and join an adjacent one that permits the ordination of women.
- The American Catholic Church in the United States, ACCUS, ordained their first woman priest, Kathleen Maria MacPherson, on June 12, 2011.
- In April 2011, the Institute for Buddhist Dialectical Studies (IBD) in Dharamsala, India, conferred the degree of geshema (a Tibetan Buddhist academic degree) on Venerable Kelsang Wangmo, a German nun, thus making her the world's first woman to receive that degree.
- In 2011, the North American Division of the Seventh-day Adventist Church, without General Conference approval, voted to permit women to serve as conference presidents. However, in early 2012, the GC responded to the NAD action with an analysis of church history and policy, demonstrating that divisions do not have the authority to establish policy different from GC policy, and the NAD immediately rescinded their action.
- 2012:
- Ilana Mills was ordained, thus making her, Jordana Chernow-Reader, and Mari Chernow the first three female siblings in America to become rabbis.
- Miri Gold, born in the United States, became the first non-Orthodox rabbi (and the first female rabbi) to have her salary paid by the Israeli government.
- Ephraim Mirvis appointed Lauren Levin as Britain's first Orthodox female halakhic adviser, at Finchley Synagogue in London.
- Alona Lisitsa became the first female rabbi in Israel to join a religious council.
- Jo Henderson became the first Anglican priest to be ordained in the United Arab Emirates.
- Agnes M. Sigurðardóttir was the first woman to be Bishop of Iceland.
- Eileen Harrop became the first woman from South East Asia (specifically, Singapore) to be ordained by the Church of England.
- Amel Manyon became the first South Sudanese woman to be ordained in the Uniting Church in Australia.
- Ellinah Wamukoya of the Anglican Church of Southern Africa became the bishop-elect of Swaziland and the first woman to be a bishop in any of the twelve Anglican Provinces in Africa. She was consecrated as a bishop in November 2012.
- Pérsida Gudiel became the first woman ordained by the Lutheran Church in Guatemala.
- Mimi Kanku Mukendi became the first female pastor ordained by the Communauté Evangélique Mennonite au Congo (Mennonite Evangelical Community of Congo), although they voted to ordain women as pastors in 1993.
- The Mennonite Church of Congo approved women's ordination.
- Christine Lee was ordained as the Episcopal Church's first female Korean-American priest.
- Alma Louise De bode-Olton became the first female priest ordained in the Anglican Episcopal Church in Curaçao.
- Margaret Brenda Vertue of the Anglican Church of Southern Africa became the bishop-elect in the Cape Town area of False Bay and the second woman to be a bishop in any of the twelve Anglican Provinces in Africa.
- Tine Lindhardt became the bishop-elect of Funen and the third woman to become a bishop in the Evangelical Lutheran Church of Denmark.
- Karen Kime became the first Indigenous Australian woman archdeacon in the Anglican Church.
- On April 23, 2012, the North German Union of the Seventh-day Adventist Church voted to ordain women as ministers.
- On July 29, 2012, the Columbia Union Conference of the Seventh-day Adventist Church voted to "authorize ordination without respect to gender."
- On August 19, 2012 the Pacific Union Conference of the Seventh-day Adventist Church voted to ordain without regard to gender. Both unions began immediately approving ordinations of women.
- Emma Slade, a British woman, became the first Western woman to be ordained as a Buddhist nun in Bhutan.
- It was announced that young women could serve as Mormon missionaries beginning at age 19 instead of 21. However, it was also announced that all male missionaries, regardless of nation, could serve from age 18. Prior to the announcement, male members from some countries were allowed to serve from the younger age to avoid conflict with educational or military requirements.
- 2013:
- On May 12, 2013, the Danish Union of the Seventh-day Adventist Church voted to treat men and women ministers the same, and to suspend all ordinations until after the topic was considered at the next GC session in 2015.
- On May 30, 2013 the Netherlands Union of the Seventh-day Adventist Church voted to ordain female pastors, recognizing them as equal to their male colleagues. On September 1, 2013, a woman was ordained in the Netherlands Union.
- Melbourne's vicar-general, Barbara Darling, became the first woman to ordain Anglican clergy in Australia.
- Kay Goldsworthy became the first bishop who was a woman, and the second Anglican woman, to appear on a public nomination list for a synod election in Australia (the Newcastle synod election).
- Linda L. Booth became the first woman elected to serve as president of the Council of Twelve of the Community of Christ.
- Lynn Green was elected as the first female general secretary of the Baptist Union of Great Britain.
- Marianne Christiansen became the bishop-elect of Haderslev and the fourth woman to become a bishop in the Evangelical Lutheran Church of Denmark.
- The Evangelical Lutheran Church in America, the largest Lutheran denomination in the U.S., elected its first female presiding bishop (the Revd Elizabeth Eaton).
- Helen-Ann Hartley became the first woman ordained in the Church of England to be elected as a diocesan bishop (in the Diocese of Waikato in New Zealand).
- On September 12, 2013, the Governing Body of the Church in Wales passed a bill to enable women to be ordained as bishops, although none would be ordained for at least a year.
- Pat Storey was the first woman to be appointed as a bishop in the Church of Ireland, and the first in all Ireland and the United Kingdom. The Church of Ireland has permitted the ordination of women as bishops since 1990.
- The Church of Sweden elected Antje Jackelen as Sweden's first female archbishop.
- The Anglican Synod of Ballarat voted to allow the ordination of women as priests.
- Mary Froiland was the first woman elected as a bishop in the South-Central Synod of Wisconsin of the Evangelical Lutheran Church of America.
- On September 22, 2013, Congregation Beth Elohim of New York dedicated a new Torah, which members of Beth Elohim said was the first Torah in New York City to be scribed by a woman. The Torah was scribed by Linda Coppleson.
- The first class of female halachic advisers trained to practice in the U.S. graduated; they graduated from the North American branch of Nishmat's yoetzet halacha program in a ceremony at Congregation Sheartith Israel, Spanish and Portuguese Synagogue in Manhattan.
- At its meeting on February 7, 2013, the House of Bishops of the Church of England decided that eight senior women clergy, elected regionally, would participate in all meetings of the house until such time as there were six women sitting as bishops by right.
- On October 27, 2013, Sandra Roberts became the first woman to lead a Seventh-day Adventist conference when she was elected as president of the Southeastern California Conference. However, the worldwide Seventh-day Adventist church did not recognize this because presidents of conferences must be ordained pastors and the worldwide church did not recognize the ordination of women.
- Agnes Abuom of Nairobi, from the Anglican Church of Kenya, was elected as moderator of the Central Committee of the World Council of Churches; she was the first woman and the first African to hold this position.
- Dr. Sarah Macneil was appointed as the first female diocesan bishop in Australia.
- Jean A. Stevens became the first woman to pray in an LDS Church general conference session.
- Yeshivat Maharat, located in the United States, became the first Orthodox Jewish institution to consecrate female clergy. The graduates of Yeshivat Maharat did not call themselves "rabbis." The title they were given is "maharat." However, in 2015 Yaffa Epstein was ordained as Rabba by the Yeshivat Maharat. Also that year, Lila Kagedan was ordained as Rabbi by the Yeshivat Maharat, making her their first graduate to take the title Rabbi.
- Tibetan women were able to take the geshe exams for the first time. Geshe is a Tibetan Buddhist academic degree for monks and nuns.
- Nancy Abramson became the first female president of the Cantors Assembly, an international professional organization of cantors associated with Conservative Judaism.
- In 2013, the Church of South India consecrated its first female bishop, Eggoni Pushpalalitha.
- 2014:
- Fanny Sohet Belanger, born in France, was ordained in America and thus became the first French female priest in the Episcopal Church.
- Dr. Sarah Macneil was consecrated and installed as the first female diocesan bishop in Australia (for the Diocese of Grafton in New South Wales).
- The Lutheran Church in Chile ordained Rev. Hanna Schramm, born in Germany, as its first female pastor.
- Heather Cook was the first woman elected as a bishop in the Episcopal Diocese of Maryland.
- The Bishop of Basel, Felix Gmür, allowed the Basel Catholic church corporations, which are officially only responsible for church finances, to formulate an initiative appealing for equality between men and women in ordination to the priesthood.
- The Association of Catholic Priests in Ireland stated that the Catholic church must ordain women and allow priests to marry in order to survive.
- American rabbi Deborah Waxman was inaugurated as the president of the Reconstructionist Rabbinical College and Jewish Reconstructionist Communities on October 26, 2014. As the president of the Reconstructionist Rabbinical College, she is believed to be the first woman and first lesbian to lead a Jewish congregational union, and the first female rabbi and first lesbian to lead a Jewish seminary; the Reconstructionist Rabbinical College is both a congregational union and a seminary.
- The first ever book of halachic decisions written by women who were ordained to serve as poskim (Idit Bartov and Anat Novoselsky) was published. The women were ordained by the municipal chief rabbi of Efrat, Rabbi Shlomo Riskin, after completing Midreshet Lindenbaum women's college's five-year ordination course in advanced studies in Jewish law, as well as passing examinations equivalent to the rabbinate's requirement for men.
- Angeline Franciscan Sister Mary Melone was appointed as the first female rector of a pontifical university in Rome; specifically, the Pontifical University Antonianum.
- The General Synod of the Church of England voted to allow for the ordination of women as bishops.
- Gayle Harris of the Episcopal Diocese of Massachusetts became the first female Anglican bishop to preside and preach in a Welsh cathedral.
- The Seventh-day Adventist Church's Women's Ministries department released The Woman's Bible, which was the first study Bible specifically designed for women by the Seventh-day Adventist Church, and which was a New King James Version of the Bible that offered more than 100 commentaries, study materials, and profiles on female biblical characters. All the articles in The Woman's Bible were written by Adventist women members, biblical scholars, and pastors.
- Sr. Luzia Premoli, superior general of the Combonian Missionary Sisters, was appointed a member of the Congregation for the Evangelization of Peoples, thus becoming the first woman to be appointed a member of a Vatican congregation (which is one of the higher ranking departments of the Roman Curia).
- It was announced that Lauma Lagzdins Zusevics, an American, was the first woman elected Archbishop of the Latvian Evangelical Lutheran Church Abroad.
- 2015:
- Ute Steyer became the first female rabbi in Sweden.
- Mira Rivera, born in Michigan, became the first Filipino-American woman to be ordained as a rabbi.
- Libby Lane became the first woman ordained as a bishop of the Church of England.
- The Women's Mosque of America, which claims to be America's first female-only mosque, opened in Los Angeles.
- Jennie Rosenfeld became the first female Orthodox spiritual advisor in Israel (specifically, she became the spiritual advisor, also called manhiga ruchanit, for the community of Efrat.)
- Archbishop Antje Jackelen became the first female archbishop to be welcomed at the Vatican.
- The first bhikkhuni ordination in Germany, the Theravada bhikkhuni ordination of German nun Samaneri Dhira, occurred on June 21, 2015 at Anenja Vihara.
- The first Theravada ordination of bhikkhunis in Indonesia after more than a thousand years occurred at Wisma Kusalayani in Lembang, Bandung. Those ordained included Vajiradevi Sadhika Bhikkhuni from Indonesia, Medha Bhikkhuni from Sri Lanka, Anula Bhikkhuni from Japan, Santasukha Santamana Bhikkhuni from Vietnam, Sukhi Bhikkhuni and Sumangala Bhikkhuni from Malaysia, and Jenti Bhikkhuni from Australia.
- In the GC session in Dallas on July 9, 2015, Seventh-day Adventists voted not to allow their regional church bodies to ordain women pastors.
- Rachel Treweek was consecrated as the first female diocesan bishop in the Church of England (Diocese of Gloucester). She and Sarah Mullally, Bishop of Crediton, were the first women to be consecrated and ordained bishop in Canterbury Cathedral.
- The Church of Jesus Christ of Latter-day Saints appointed women to its executive councils for the first time. The church appointed Linda K. Burton, president of the Relief Society, Rosemary Wixom, president of the Primary, and Bonnie L. Oscarson, president of the Young Women's organization, to three high-level church councils (one woman to each).
- Tahrir Hammad became the first woman to be permitted to perform Muslim marriages in the Palestinian territories.
- Mary Irwin-Gibson became the first woman to be a bishop of the Anglican Diocese of Montreal.
- Sarah Mullally became the first woman in the Church of England to lead an ordination service; she ordained Leisa McGovern and Sheila Walker on September 26, in Ottery St Mary in Devon.
- Rachel Treweek became the first woman to sit in the House of Lords as a Lord Spiritual, thus making her at the time the most senior ordained woman in the Church of England.
- Bolivia became the first diocese in the Anglican Province of South America (formerly known as the Southern Cone) to ordain women as priests.
- The Rev. Susana Lopez Lerena, the Rev. Cynthia Myers Dickin and the Rev. Audrey Taylor Gonzalez became the first women Anglican priests ordained in the diocese of Uruguay.
- Yaffa Epstein was ordained as Rabba by the Yeshivat Maharat.
- The title of maharat was granted to a European for the first time: Miriam Gonczarska of Poland.
- Lila Kagedan was ordained as Rabbi by the Yeshivat Maharat, making her their first graduate to take the title Rabbi.
- The Rabbinical Council of America passed a resolution which states, "RCA members with positions in Orthodox institutions may not ordain women into the Orthodox rabbinate, regardless of the title used; or hire or ratify the hiring of a woman into a rabbinic position at an Orthodox institution; or allow a title implying rabbinic ordination to be used by a teacher of Limudei Kodesh in an Orthodox institution."
- The Agudath Israel of America denounced moves to ordain women, and went even further, declaring Yeshivat Maharat, Yeshivat Chovevei Torah, Open Orthodoxy, and other affiliated entities to be similar to other dissident movements throughout Jewish history in having rejected basic tenets of Judaism.
- 2016:
- After four years of deliberation, Hebrew Union College – Jewish Institute of Religion decided to give women a choice of wording on their ordination certificates beginning in 2016, including the option to have the same wording as men. Up until then, male candidates' certificates identified them by the Reform movement's traditional "morenu harav," or "our teacher the rabbi," while female candidates' certificates only used the term "rav u’morah," or "rabbi and teacher."
- Women first began administering Holy Communion in the Evangelical Church of the Augsburg Confession in Poland.
- Lila Kagedan became the first female clergy member hired by an Orthodox synagogue while using the title "rabbi." This occurred when Mount Freedom Jewish Center in New Jersey, which is Open Orthodox, hired Kagedan to join their "spiritual leadership team."
- It was announced that the Roman Missal had been revised to permit women to have their feet washed on Holy Thursday; previously it permitted only males to do so.
- It was announced that Ephraim Mirvis created the job of ma'ayan by which women would be advisers on Jewish law in the area of family purity and as adult educators in Orthodox synagogues. This requires a part-time training course for 18 months, which was the first such course in the United Kingdom.
- The highest governing body of the Evangelical Lutheran Church of Latvia amended the church rules, officially establishing that only men can be ordained as priests.
- The United Methodist Church elected its first openly lesbian bishop, Karen Oliveto.
- It was learned that the Satmar sect issued a decree warning that university education for women was "dangerous". Written in Yiddish, the decree warned:

"It has lately become the new trend that girls and married women are pursuing degrees in special education. Some attend classes and others online. And so we'd like to let their parents know that it is against the Torah.

We will be very strict about this. No girls attending our school are allowed to study and get a degree. It is dangerous. Girls who will not abide will be forced to leave our school. Also, we will not give any jobs or teaching position in the school to girls who've been to college or have a degree.

We have to keep our school safe and we can't allow any secular influences in our holy environment. It is against the base upon which our Mosed was built."

- Karmit Feintuch became the first woman to be hired as a communal leader at an Orthodox synagogue in Israel (Ramban Synagogue).
- In February 2016, the Mariam mosque in Copenhagen, Denmark's first female-run mosque, was founded by Sherin Khankan; it has only female imams. The mosque is open to male and female worshippers, with the exception of Friday prayers, which are only open to female worshippers. Imam Sherin Khankan became Scandinavia's first female imam when she opened that mosque.
- Twenty Tibetan Buddhist nuns became the first Tibetan women to earn geshema degrees.
- The Church in Wales elected Joanna Penberthy as its first female bishop.
- In 2016, the Holy Synod of the Greek Orthodox Patriarchate of Alexandria and all Africa voted to reinstate the female diaconate.
- 2017:
- The Orthodox Union adopted a policy banning women from serving as clergy, from holding titles such as "rabbi", or from doing common clergy functions even without a title, in its congregations in the United States.
- Susan Frederick-Gray was elected as the first female president of the Unitarian Universalist Association.
- Keshira haLev Fife was ordained by the Kohenet Hebrew Priestess Institute, thus becoming Australia's first Hebrew Priestess.
- Guli Francis-Dehqani, who was Iranian and Persian, became the first Bishop of Loughborough, which made her the Church of England's first female bishop from a minority ethnic community.
- Ruti Regan became the first openly autistic person to be ordained by the Jewish Theological Seminary of America.
- The Greek Orthodox Patriarchate of Alexandria and all Africa ordained six sub-deaconesses in the Democratic Republic of Congo.
- 2018:
- In 1991, the Kerala High Court restricted entry of women above the age of 10 and below the age of 50 from Sabarimala Shrine as they were of the menstruating age. However, on 28 September 2018, the Supreme Court of India lifted the ban on the entry of women. It said that discrimination against women on any grounds, even religious, is unconstitutional.
- Lauren Tuchman was ordained by the Jewish Theological Seminary of America and thus became the first ordained blind female rabbi.
- The Anglican Episcopal Church of Brazil (Igreja Episcopal Anglicana do Brasil) elected Marinez Santos Bassotto as its first female bishop; she was chosen as Bishop of the Diocese of Amazon.
- Jamitha Teacher became the first woman imam in India to lead the Jumu'ah prayer for women and men.
- The Orthodox Union stated that the four OU synagogues that already employed women clergy would be allowed to stay in the OU without making any changes.
- Denise Donato was ordained as the first female bishop in the Ecumenical Catholic Communion.
- Kay Goldsworthy of Australia was installed as the first female Anglican archbishop.
- The Evangelical Lutheran Church in Thailand had its first women ordained into ministry, namely Jongkolnee Sampachanyanon Sim and Somporn Kulachote.
- Patricia A. Davenport became the first African American woman to be elected a bishop in the Evangelical Lutheran Church in America; she was elected to head the Southeastern Pennsylvania Synod.
- Dina Brawer, born in Italy but living in Britain, was ordained by Yeshivat Maharat and thus became Britain's first female Orthodox rabbi; she chose the title "rabba", the feminine form of rabbi.
- On May 12, Melissa M. Skelton was elected Metropolitan of British Columbia and Yukon and thus became Archbishop of New Westminster. She was the first woman to become an archbishop in the Anglican Church of Canada.
- In July, Bishop Christine Gooden-Benguche became the first female president of the Methodist Church in the Caribbean and the Americas, Jamaica District.
- In September, bishop Kristina Kühnbaum-Schmidt became bishop of the Evangelical Lutheran Church in Northern Germany.
- 2019:
- Wai Quayle became Te Pīhopa o Te Upoko o Te Ika; this made her the first female Māori bishop in the Anglican Church, and the first woman born in New Zealand to become a bishop in the Anglican Communion.
- Beate Hofmann became the first bishop of Evangelical Church of Hesse Electorate-Waldeck.
- Emelyn Dacuycuy was consecrated as the first woman bishop of the Iglesia Filipina Independiente.
- Linda Nicholls was elected as the first female Primate of the Anglican Church of Canada.
- Ohio minister Donna Barrett was elected as Assemblies of God general secretary, which was the first time the Assemblies of God General Council elected a woman to its executive leadership; she had been appointed to the post the previous year, which had made her the first woman to fill a seat on the Assemblies of God's six-person executive leadership team.
- A social statement from the Evangelical Lutheran Church in America, titled "Faith, Sexism, and Justice: A Call to Action", was approved by the ELCA's Churchwide Assembly on August 9; it calls sexism and patriarchy sins and acknowledges the church's complicity in them.
- Eva Janadin and Anne-Sophie Monsinay became the first female imams to lead Muslim prayers in France.
- The Methodist Church of Southern Africa inducted Purity Malinga as Presiding Bishop, making her the first female Bishop in the church.
- Roxanne Haynes was installed as the first female Bishop of Bermuda and the Caribbean region of the United Fellowship of Churches International.
- On 24 May 2019, five women and one man were appointed consultor to the general secretariat of the Synod of Bishops in the Catholic Church. This was the first time women were appointed to this position.
- On 19 November 2019, Rose Hudson-Wilkin was consecrated as a bishop by Justin Welby during a service at St Paul's Cathedral, making her the first black woman to become a Church of England bishop. She was installed as Bishop of Dover during a service at Canterbury Cathedral on 30 November 2019.
- In the Mormon temple endowment, women were urged to each be a priestess "unto her husband," while men were promised they would be priests to God; but in January 2019, that was removed from the endowment process, in accordance with other changes that included more lines for Eve in the ritual performance of the Book of Genesis.
- In 2019, veiling of women during part of the Mormon temple endowment ceremony was discontinued.
- In 2019, a letter from the LDS Church's First Presidency stated that "Veiling an endowed woman's face prior to burial is optional." It had previously been required. The letter went on to say that such veiling, “may be done if the sister expressed such a desire while she was living. In cases where the wishes of the deceased sister on this matter are not known, her family should be consulted”.
- In 2019, the LDS Church announced that any baptized woman could serve as a witness for the baptism of a living person outside the temple, and any woman holding a current temple recommend, including a limited-use recommend, could be a witness for a proxy baptism for a deceased person, and any woman who was an endowed member with a current temple recommend could serve as a witness to sealing ordinances, living and proxy.

==== 2020s ====
- 2020:
- The Church of Sweden had more female than male priests for the first time.
- The Anglican Diocese of Cape Coast ordained its first female priest, Vida Gyabeng Frimpong.
- 2021:
- On 6 February 2021, Pope Francis appointed Nathalie Becquart an undersecretary of the Synod of Bishops, making her the first woman to have the right to vote in the Synod of Bishops.
- On 9 March 2021, Pope Francis chose Núria Calduch to be the Secretary of the Pontifical Biblical Commission, making her the first woman to reach this office.
- Pope Francis issued the motu proprio “Spiritus Domini”, which changed canon 230 § 1 of the Code of Canon Law from “lay men who possess the age and qualifications established by decree of the conference of bishops can be admitted on a stable basis through the prescribed liturgical rite to the ministries of lector and acolyte” to “Lay persons of suitable age and with the gifts determined by decree of the Episcopal Conference may be permanently assigned, by means of the established liturgical rite, to the ministries of lectors and acolytes; however, the conferment of such a role does not entitle them to support or remuneration from the Church.” This meant women could begin to be admitted to the instituted ministries of acolyte and lector in the Catholic Church, which they could not before.
- Emily Onyango was appointed the first woman bishop of the Anglican Church of Kenya.
- 2022:
- The official lineage of Tibetan Buddhist bhikkhunis recommenced on 23 June 2022 in Bhutan when 144 nuns, most of them Butanese, were fully ordained.
- The Evangelical Church of the Augsburg Confession in Poland ordained women as pastors for the first time.
- The Rev. Tammy Swanson-Draheim was elected as the first female president of the denomination called the Evangelical Covenant Church.
- On 13 July 2022, Pope Francis appointed women as members of the Dicastery for Bishops for the first time. He appointed two nuns and one laywoman - Raffaella Petrini, Yvonne Reungoat, and María Lía Zervino.
- Jenna Carson became the first female military chaplain endorsed by the Church of Jesus Christ of Latter-day Saints.
- Deborah K. Webb was consecrated and installed as the first female bishop in the Temple of Praise International Fellowship of Churches, Incorporated.
- The Progressive National Baptist Convention elected Jacqueline A. Thompson as second vice president, which made her the first woman to hold an elected leadership role in the Progressive National Baptist Convention.
- The Rocky Mountain Conference (RMC) of the Seventh-day Adventist Church approved ordaining women pastors.
- Ruby-Nell Estrella was elected as the first woman bishop of the United Methodist Church in the Philippines.
- Irene Muzás Calpe, born in Spain and ordained in Germany, became the first female rabbi in Spain upon starting a job as a rabbi at the Atid synagogue in Barcelona.
- Michelle Hill became the first woman commissioned to lead a Seventh-day Adventist church in Bermuda.
- Lorita Packwood and Jennie Foster Skelton were ordained as the first female deacons in the Anglican Church of Bermuda. This was the first time the Anglican Church of Bermuda ordained women for ministry.

2023:

- Sally Azar was ordained on January 22, 2023 by the Evangelical Lutheran Church in Jordan and the Holy Land in a ceremony at the Church of the Redeemer in Jerusalem, making her the first female Palestinian pastor in the Holy Land.
- On April 26, 2023, Pope Francis announced that women would be allowed to vote at the Sixteenth Ordinary General Assembly of the Synod of Bishops, marking the first time women were allowed to vote at any Catholic Synod of Bishops.
- In June 2023, the Christian and Missionary Alliance of the United States approved women being ordained as pastors, but only if the women's local church leadership approves, and never as senior or lead pastors.
- On June 25, Sofía Betancourt became the president of the Unitarian Universalist Association (UUA); she was the first woman of color and first openly queer person to be elected to the office.
- On July 3, 2023, the General Synod of the United Church of Christ elected Rev. Karen Georgia Thompson as the first woman, and the first African-American woman, to lead the denomination as General Minister and President.
- Kamila Kopřivová, born in the Czech Republic and ordained by Leo Baeck College in London, became the first Czech female rabbi and started a job as a rabbi at the Westminster Synagogue in London.
- On October 13, Sister María de los Dolores Palencia Gómez led the Sixteenth Ordinary General Assembly of the Synod of Bishops, which made her the first woman to preside over any Catholic Synod of Bishops.
- The Anglican Church of Mozambique and Angola elected Filomena Tete Estevão as its first female bishop.
- The Church of the Province of Central Africa approved the ordination of women to the diaconate and to the priesthood, allowing each diocese to decide whether or not to ordain women.
- Myriam Ackermann-Sommer of France received a rabbinical degree from Yeshivat Maharat in America, thus making her France's first female Orthodox rabbi.

2024:

- Rachel Marszalek became the first woman licensed as a priest-in-charge in the Anglican Church of Bermuda.
- The Greek Orthodox Patriarchate of Alexandria and all Africa ordained its first female deacon, Angelic Molen, in Zimbabwe, making her the first female deacon in the Eastern Orthodox Church.
- The Synod of the Anglican Diocese of Tabora in the Anglican Church of Tanzania voted to allow the ordination of women priests.
- 2024 was the first year in recorded history that women were involved in the ceremonial replacement of the kiswa. That year, women working for the General Authority for the Care of the Two Holy Mosques were involved in carrying parts of the new kiswa and giving them to men, before the men took them to Mecca.
- The High Court of Justice in Israel ruled that women are eligible to serve on the Chief Rabbinate Council and as rabbis on the Chief Rabbi Election Assembly.
- The General Synod of the Lutheran Church of Australia voted to remove the clause banning ordination of women from their "Theses of Agreement", thus opening the possibility of women's ordination.
- Shoshana Nambi became the first female rabbi from Uganda; she was ordained by the Hebrew Union College – Jewish Institute of Religion in New York.

2026:

- Sarah Mullally becomes the first female primate of the Church of England and Archbishop of Canterbury.
