= Timeline of women rabbis =

This is a timeline of women rabbis:

- 1930s
  - 1935: In Germany, Regina Jonas became the first woman to be ordained as a rabbi.
- 1970s:
  - 1972: Sally Priesand became America's first female rabbi ordained by a rabbinical seminary, and the second formally ordained female rabbi in Jewish history, after Regina Jonas.
  - 1974: Sandy Eisenberg Sasso became the first female rabbi in Reconstructionist Judaism.
  - 1975: Jackie Tabick, born in Dublin, became the first female rabbi in Britain.
  - 1975: Jackie Tabick became the first female rabbi to marry a rabbi (Larry Tabick).
  - 1976: Michal Mendelsohn became the first presiding female rabbi in a North American congregation when she was hired by Temple Beth El Shalom in San Jose, California.
  - 1977: Sandy Eisenberg Sasso and her husband Dennis Sasso became the first couple to serve jointly as rabbis when they were hired by Beth-El Zedeck in Indianapolis.
  - 1979: Linda Joy Holtzman became the first woman to serve as a rabbi for a Conservative congregation when she was hired by Beth Israel Congregation of Chester County, which was then located in Coatesville, Pennsylvania. She had graduated in 1979 from the Reconstructionist Rabbinical College in Philadelphia, yet was hired by Beth Israel despite their being a Conservative congregation.
- 1980s:
  - 1980: Joan Friedman became the first woman to serve as a rabbi in Canada in 1980, when she was appointed as an Assistant Rabbi at Holy Blossom Temple in Toronto. Her appointment was followed shortly after by that of Elyse Goldstein as Assistant Rabbi from 1983 to 1986; Goldstein has been described as the first female rabbi in Canada, but that is incorrect.
  - 1981: Helene Ferris became the first second-career female rabbi.
  - 1981: Lynn Gottlieb became the first female rabbi in Jewish Renewal.
  - 1981: Bonnie Koppell became the first female rabbi to serve in the U.S. military. She joined the army reserves in 1978 while a rabbinical student at the Reconstructionist Rabbinical College in Philadelphia, Pennsylvania, and was ordained in 1981.
  - 1981: Karen Soria, born and ordained in the United States, became Australia's first female rabbi.
  - 1984: From 1984 to 1990 Barbara Borts, born in America, was a rabbi at Radlett Reform Synagogue, making her the first woman rabbi to have a pulpit of her own in a UK Reform Judaism synagogue.
  - 1985: Amy Eilberg became the first female rabbi in Conservative Judaism.
  - 1986: Amy Perlin became the first female rabbi in America to start her own congregation, Temple B'nai Shalom in Fairfax Station, which she was the founding rabbi of in 1986.
  - 1986: Leslie Alexander became the first female rabbi of a major Conservative Jewish synagogue in the United States in 1986 at Adat Ari El synagogue in North Hollywood.
  - 1987: Rabbi Joy Levitt became the first female president of the Reconstructionist Rabbinical Association.
  - 1988: Stacy Offner became the first openly lesbian rabbi hired by a mainstream Jewish congregation (Shir Tikvah in Minneapolis).
  - 1989: Rachel Cowan, ordained by the Hebrew Union College-Jewish Institute of Religion, became the first female rabbi who had converted to Judaism.
  - 1989: Einat Ramon, ordained in New York, became the first female native-Israeli rabbi.
- 1990s:
  - 1990: Pauline Bebe became the first female rabbi in France.
  - 1992: Naamah Kelman, born in the United States, became the first female rabbi ordained in Israel.
  - 1992: Karen Soria became the first female rabbi to serve in the U.S. Marines, which she did from 1992 until 1996.
  - 1993: Rebecca Dubowe became the first Deaf woman to be ordained as a rabbi in the United States.
  - 1993: Valerie Stessin, born in France, became the first woman to be ordained as a Conservative rabbi in Israel, as well as the first woman to be ordained by the Schechter Institute of Jewish Studies.
  - 1993: Maya Leibovich became the first native-born female rabbi in Israel; she was ordained in 1993 at the Hebrew Union College-Jewish Institute of Religion in Jerusalem.
  - 1993: Ariel Stone became the first American rabbi to lead a congregation in the former Soviet Union, and the first progressive rabbi to serve the Jewish community in Ukraine.
  - 1993: Chana Timoner became the first female rabbi to hold an active duty assignment as a chaplain in the U.S. Army.
  - 1994: Rabbi Laura Geller became the first woman to lead a major metropolitan congregation, specifically Temple Emanuel in Beverly Hills.
  - 1994: Analia Bortz became the first female rabbi ordained in Argentina at the Seminario Rabinico Latinoamericano Marshall T. Meyer.
  - 1994: Mimi Feigelson was probably the first Orthodox female Rabbi - initially ordained by Shlomo Carlebach. Feigelson was then ordained by a panel of three Rabbis in 1996, after Carlebach's death in 1994.
  - 1995: Dianne Cohler-Esses became the first Syrian woman to become a rabbi, and the first Syrian non-Orthodox rabbi, when she was ordained by the Jewish Theological Seminary in 1995.
  - 1995: Bea Wyler, born in Switzerland, who had studied at the Jewish Theological Seminary of America in New York, became the first female rabbi in postwar Germany, in the city of Oldenburg.
  - 1996: Cynthia Culpeper became the first pulpit rabbi to announce being diagnosed with AIDS, which she did when she was rabbi of Agudath Israel in Montgomery, Alabama.
  - 1997: Chava Koster became the first female rabbi from the Netherlands.
  - 1999: Tamara Kolton became the very first rabbi of either sex in Humanistic Judaism.
- 2000s:
  - 2000: Helga Newmark, born in Germany, became the first female Holocaust survivor ordained as a rabbi. She was ordained in America.
  - 2001: Angela Warnick Buchdahl, born in Korea, became the first Asian-American rabbi. She was ordained in America.
  - 2001: Eveline Goodman-Thau became the first female rabbi in Austria.
  - 2002: Jacqueline Mates-Muchin was ordained by Hebrew Union College-Jewish Institute of Religion in New York, and thus became the first Chinese-American rabbi.
  - 2003: Sandra Kochmann, born in Paraguay, became the first female rabbi in Brazil.
  - 2003: Tsipi Gabai became the first woman from Morocco to be ordained as a rabbi.
  - 2003: Janet Marder was named the first female president of the Central Conference of American Rabbis on March 26, 2003, making her the first woman to lead a major rabbinical organization and the first woman to lead any major Jewish co-ed religious organization in the United States.
  - 2003: Sivan Malkin Maas became the first Israeli ordained by the International Institute for Secular Humanistic Judaism in 2003.
  - 2003: Sarah Schechter became the first female rabbi to serve as a chaplain in the U.S. Air Force.
  - 2004: Barbara Aiello, born in the United States, became the first female rabbi in Italy.
  - 2004: Alexandra Wright was appointed as the first senior rabbi in England.
  - 2005: Floriane Chinsky, born in France, became Belgium's first female rabbi.
  - 2005: Elisa Klapheck, born in Germany, became the first female rabbi in the Netherlands.
  - 2006: Chaya Gusfield and Lori Klein became the first openly lesbian rabbis ordained by the Jewish Renewal movement.
  - 2007: Tanya Segal, born in Russia, became the first full-time female rabbi in Poland.
  - 2007: Toba Spitzer was elected to a two-year term as president of the Reconstructionist Rabbinical Association, making her the first openly gay rabbi to lead any national rabbinical association.
  - 2008: Julie Schonfeld was named the new executive vice president of the Conservative movement's Rabbinical Assembly, becoming the first female rabbi to serve in the chief executive position of an American rabbinical association.
  - 2009: Alysa Stanton, born in Cleveland and ordained by a Reform Jewish seminary in Cincinnati, became the first African-American female rabbi. Later in 2009 she began work as a rabbi at Congregation Bayt Shalom, a small majority-white synagogue in Greenville, North Carolina, making her the first African-American rabbi to lead a majority-white congregation.
  - 2009: Lynn Feinberg became the first female rabbi in Norway, where she was born.
  - 2009: Karen Soria, born in America, became the first female rabbi in the Canadian Forces; she was assigned to the 3 Canadian Forces Flying Training School in Portage la Prairie, Manitoba.
  - 2009: Sara Hurwitz was ordained by Rabbi Daniel Sperber and Rabbi Avi Weiss, making her the first woman to receive Orthodox ordination. She took the title "Maharat," an acronym for "Morah Hilchatit Ruchanut Toranit", which literally translates as "Torah-based, spiritual teacher according to Jewish law". She founded Yeshivat Maharat to offer ordination to more Orthodox women. In February 2010, Weiss announced that he was changing Maharat to a more familiar-sounding title "Rabba". Hurwitz continues to use the title Rabba and is considered by some to be the first female Orthodox rabbi.
- 2010s:
  - 2010: Alina Treiger, born in Ukraine, became the first female rabbi to be ordained in Germany since World War II.
  - 2011: Antje Deusel became the first German-born woman to be ordained as a rabbi in Germany since the Nazi era. She was ordained by Abraham Geiger College.
  - 2011: American Rachel Isaacs became the first openly lesbian rabbi ordained by the Conservative Jewish movement's Jewish Theological Seminary of America.
  - 2011: Sandra Kviat became the first female rabbi from Denmark; she was ordained in England.
  - 2012: Ilana Mills was ordained, thus making her, Jordana Chernow-Reader, and Mari Chernow the first three female siblings in America to become rabbis.
  - 2012: Alona Lisitsa became the first female rabbi in Israel to join a religious council. Although Leah Shakdiel, who was not a rabbi, joined the Yerucham religious council in 1988 after a Supreme Court decision in her favor, no female rabbi had joined a religious council until Lisitsa joined Mevasseret Zion's in 2012. She was appointed to the council three years before that, but the Religious Affairs Ministry delayed approving her appointment until Israel's High Court of Justice ordered it to.
  - 2012: American Emily Aviva Kapor, who had been ordained privately by a "Conservadox" rabbi in 2005, began living as a woman in 2012, thus becoming the first openly transgender female rabbi.
  - 2014: American rabbi Deborah Waxman was inaugurated as the president of the Reconstructionist Rabbinical College and Jewish Reconstructionist Communities on October 26, 2014. As the president of the Reconstructionist Rabbinical College, she is believed to be the first woman and first lesbian to lead a Jewish congregational union, and the first female rabbi and first lesbian to lead a Jewish seminary; the Reconstructionist Rabbinical College is both a congregational union and a seminary.
  - 2014: American rabbi Judith Hauptman became the first guest lecturer from abroad to address the Israeli Knesset's weekly religious study session.
  - 2015: Ute Steyer became the first female rabbi in Sweden.
  - 2015: Mira Rivera, born in Michigan, became the first Filipino-American woman to be ordained as a rabbi.
  - 2015: Lila Kagedan, born in Canada, became the first graduate of Yeshivat Maharat to use the title "Rabbi". She later became the first woman with the title rabbi to be hired by an American Open Orthodox synagogue when Mount Freedom Jewish Center in Randolph, New Jersey hired her as a spiritual leader in January 2016.
  - 2015: Abby Stein came out as transgender and thus became the first openly transgender woman to have been ordained by an Orthodox Jewish institution, having received her rabbinical degree in 2011, before coming out as transgender. Since then she worked in many capacities as a rabbi. In 2018, she co-founded Sacred Space, a multi-faith project "which celebrates women and non-binary people of all faith traditions".
  - 2016: After four years of deliberation, Hebrew Union College-Jewish Institute of Religion decided to give women being ordained as rabbis a choice of wording on their ordination certificates beginning in 2016, including the option to have the same wording as men. Previously, male candidates' ordination certificates identified them by the Reform movement's traditional "morenu harav," or "our teacher the rabbi," while female candidates' certificates only used the term "rav u'morah," or "rabbi and teacher."
  - 2017: During this year Connie Golden served as the first woman president of the (American) National Association of Retired Reform Rabbis.
  - 2017: Nitzan Stein Kokin, who was German, became the first person to graduate from Zecharias Frankel College in Germany, which also made her the first Conservative rabbi to be ordained in Germany since before World War II.
  - 2018: Dina Brawer, born in Italy but living in Britain, was ordained by Yeshivat Maharat and thus became Britain's first female Orthodox rabbi; she chose the title "rabba", the feminine form of rabbi.
  - 2018: Lauren Tuchman was ordained at the Jewish Theological Seminary, becoming the first blind woman to enter the rabbinate.
  - 2018: Vered Hillel became the first woman to be ordained as a rabbi by the Messianic Jewish Rabbinical Council. (Note that Messianic Judaism considers itself to be a form of Judaism but is generally considered to be a form of Christianity.)
- 2020s:
  - 2021: Shira Marili Mirvis was appointed as the sole spiritual leader and Jewish Law authority of the Shirat Tamar Synagogue which made her the first woman ever to serve in such a role in Israel.
  - 2022: Irene Muzás Calpe, born in Spain and ordained in Germany, became the first female rabbi in Spain upon starting a job as a rabbi at the Atid synagogue in Barcelona.
  - 2022: Miriam Lourie became the UK's first female Rabbinic leader - of Kehillat Nashira.
  - 2023: Miriam Udel, a Yiddish professor at Emory University, on February 1 became the first female Orthodox rabbi to give an opening prayer at any state legislature, by giving one at the Georgia House of Representatives.
  - 2023: Laura Lieber, born in Fayetteville, Arkansas and ordained at the Hebrew Union College, was appointed professor of transregional religious history at the University of Regensburg in July 2023 and assigned to the Faculty of Catholic Theology, making her the first female rabbi to be a professor at a Catholic faculty in Germany.
  - 2023: Kamila Kopřivová, born in the Czech Republic and ordained by Leo Baeck College in London, became the first Czech female rabbi and started a job as a rabbi at the Westminster Synagogue in London.
  - 2023: Myriam Ackermann-Sommer of France received a rabbinical degree from Yeshivat Maharat in America, thus making her France's first female Orthodox rabbi.
  - 2024: The High Court of Justice in Israel ruled that women are eligible to serve as rabbis on the Chief Rabbi Election Assembly.
  - 2024: Shoshana Nambi, born in Kenya, became the first female rabbi from Uganda; she was ordained by the Hebrew Union College – Jewish Institute of Religion in New York.
  - 2025: The International Israelite Board of Rabbis voted to allow women to become rabbis, but it ruled that when women rabbis are considered ritually impure (for example during menstruation or after childbirth) others must do their religious duties.

== See also ==
- Women in Judaism
- Women rabbis and Torah scholars
