= Amy Perlin =

Amy Perlin is the first female rabbi in the United States to start her own congregation, Temple B'nai Shalom in Fairfax Station, Virginia, of which she was the founding rabbi in 1986. In 1978, she graduated from Princeton University with a degree in Near Eastern Studies, with summa cum laude and Phi Beta Kappa honors. In 1980 she received a M.A.H.L. (Master of Arts in Hebrew Literature), and in 1982 she was ordained by the Reform seminary Hebrew Union College-Jewish Institute of Religion (HUC-JIR). She later earned a Doctor of Divinity degree from HUC-JIR in 2007.

In 2012 Perlin and fifteen other leaders of the Reform Jewish movement met with White House Chief of Staff Jack Lew. That year she was also honored by Jewish Women International (JWI) as one of its "Women to Watch". In 2013 she was inducted onto the Board of Governors of HUC-JIR, and was included in The Jewish Daily Forward's list of America's 36 Most Inspiring Rabbis. She is married and has two children, and she and her husband Gary have started a family foundation.

Perlin retired in 2018 after serving at Temple B'nai Shalom for 32 years.

The 2022 art exhibit “Holy Sparks”, shown among other places at the Dr. Bernard Heller Museum, featured art about twenty-four female rabbis who were firsts in some way; Deborah Ugoretz created the artwork about Perlin that was in that exhibit.

== See also ==
- Timeline of women rabbis
