= Helene Ferris =

First second-career female rabbi in Judaism

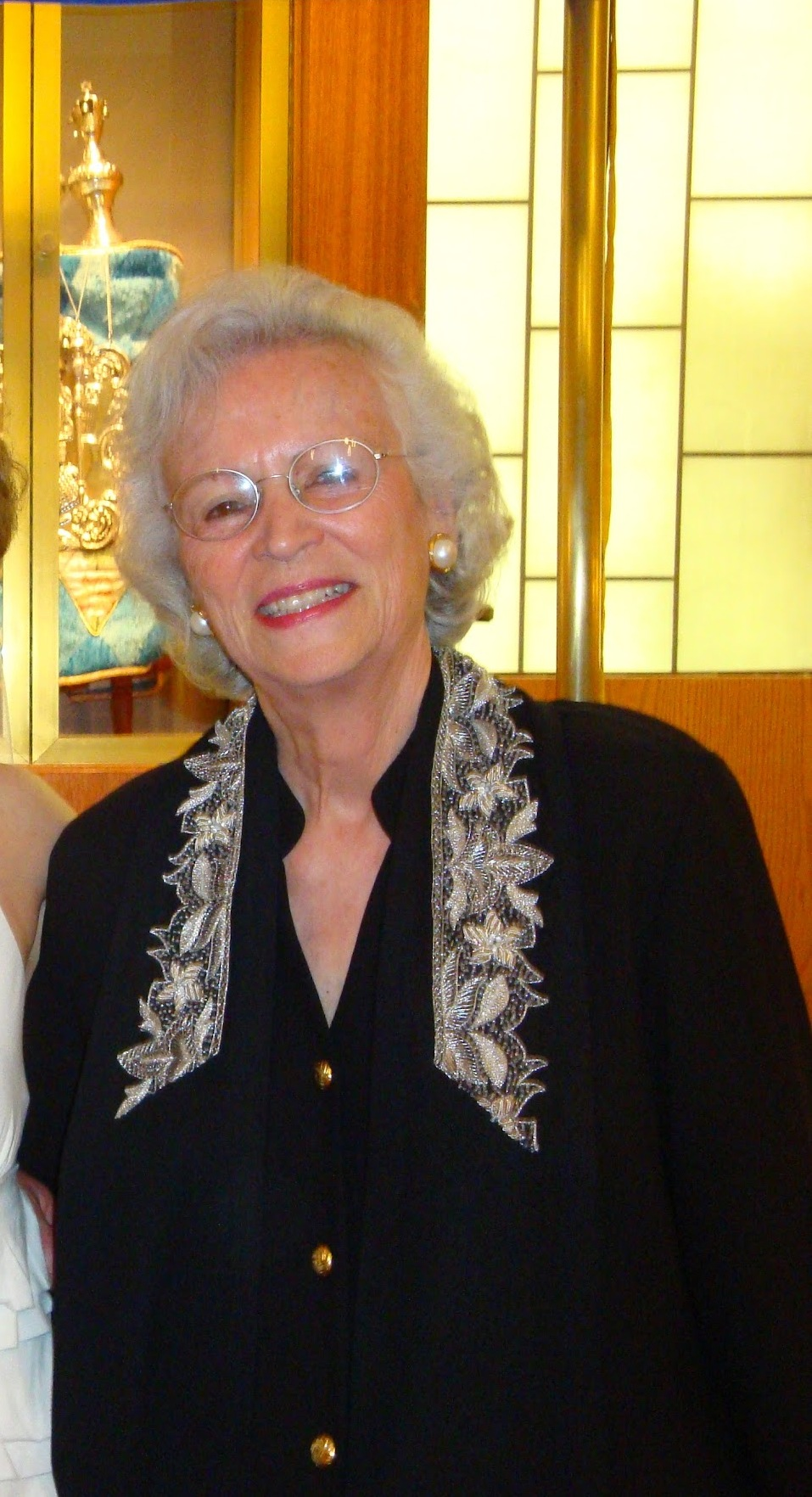
- Helene Ferris in May 2010

Personal life
- Education: Hebrew Union College – Jewish Institute of Religion

Religious life
- Religion: Judaism
- Ordination: 1981

Helene Ferris is an American rabbi. She is the first female rabbi to pursue the rabbinate as a second career.

== Early career and rabbinic education ==
Helene Ferris began her career as a first grade teacher and was a stay at home mother before deciding to pursue the rabbinate in 1976 and attending Hebrew Union College (HUC), which requires spending the first of five years in Israel. Her three children were 7-13 at the time. They accompanied her to Israel, where they attended school, while her husband, Alan, stayed behind in New York.

== Rabbinical career ==
Ferris was ordained by the Reform Jewish seminary Hebrew Union College-Jewish Institute of Religion in 1981, and worked as an associate rabbi in the Stephen Wise Free Synagogue in New York from 1981 until 1991 when she felt she had reached the proverbial "glass ceiling". From 1991 until her retirement in 2006, Ferris was the chief rabbi at Temple Israel of Northern Westchester, a Reform synagogue in Croton-on-Hudson, New York.

On December 1, 1988, Ferris helped prepare a prayer service and read from the Torah at the Western Wall, along with over 70 other Jewish women. This was the first time that Jewish women prayed and read from the Torah together at the Western Wall. Ferris is a board member of the International Committee for Women of the Wall (ICWOW), which is a group working to give women the right to lead public prayers at the Western Wall, which is now illegal.

Ferris supports the inclusion of lesbian and gay Jews in religious life. In 1986, she organized a conference on lesbian and gay Jews in New York City. In 1989 she presided over a same-sex wedding ceremony for Ileen Kaufman and Jan Catalfumo; few rabbis would officiate such a ceremony in those days.

In 2007, Letty Cottin Pogrebin chose her as one of "The Other Fifty Top Rabbis in America." She has written for Reform Judaism magazine.

== See also ==
- Timeline of women rabbis
