= Lynn Feinberg =

Norwegian rabbi

Lynn Claire Feinberg (born 1955) is a Norwegian rabbi. She became the first female rabbi in Norway in 2009. She was born in Oslo. She is an adherent of Jewish Renewal, and is the founder and spiritual leader of Havurat Kol haLev, the first Jewish Renewal havurah in Oslo.

She is also a historian of religion, specializing in women and Judaism, and is trained as an astrologer and an eco-kosher mashgicha.

== See also ==
- Timeline of women rabbis
