= Chava Koster =

Chava Koster is the first female rabbi ordained from the Netherlands. She was ordained in 1997 at the Academy for Jewish Religion in New York City.

== Career ==
Koster was previously the rabbi of the Village Temple, also known as Congregation B'nai Israel, in New York City, before joining the Village Temple, she was Associate Rabbi at Temple B'nai Abraham in Livingston, New Jersey. In 2010 she was featured in the documentary Kol Ishah: The Rabbi is a Woman, directed by Hannah Heer. In 2010 she was chosen to be the first female rabbi in Sweden; however she withdrew her name for "personal reasons."

In 2024, she became the rabbi of Beit Emanuel, the principal reform congregation in Johannesburg in South Africa.

== Personal life ==
She is the granddaughter of Dutch Holocaust survivors,

== See also ==
- Timeline of women rabbis
