= Sarah Schechter =

American rabbi

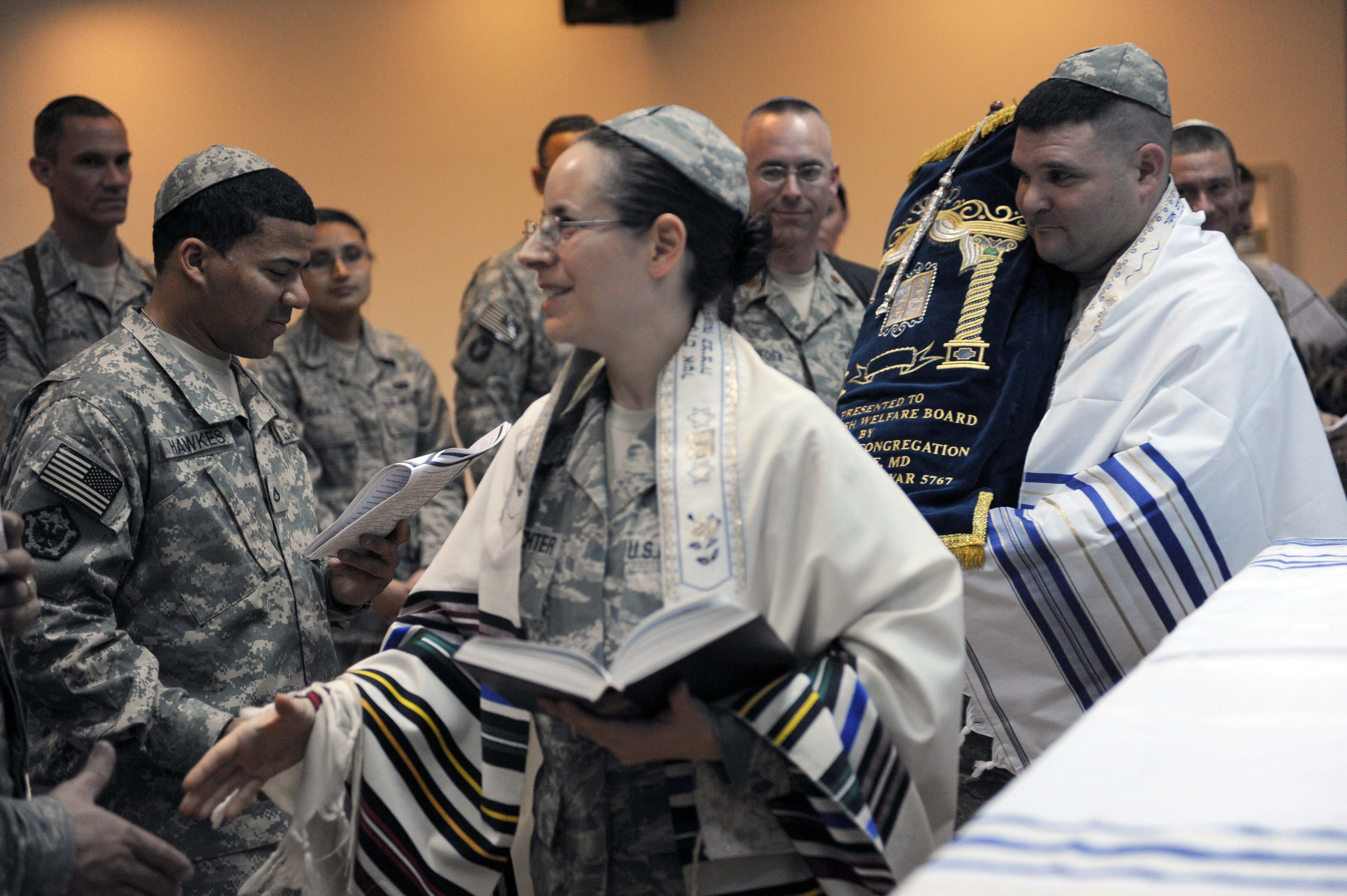
Air Force Jewish Chaplain (Capt.) Rabbi Sarah Schechter leads Jewish services, wearing traditional Jewish prayer shawl (tallit), at 332 AEW Jt. Base Balad, Iraq.

Sarah Schechter is the first female rabbi in the U.S. Air Force. She joined the Air Force as a chaplain candidate, and became a chaplain when she was ordained as a Reform rabbi in 2003. Her father was an Air Force chaplain in 1960.

She grew up in Manhattan, and decided to join the military immediately after the September 11 attacks, calling a recruiter on September 12. Her daughter Yael Emunah was born during her military service.

In 2013, she became the Jewish chaplain of the 11th Wing at Joint Base Andrews, Maryland, and was featured on the chaplain section of the Air Force website.

She wrote the piece "Personal Reflection: A Rabbi in the Military", which appears in the book The Sacred Calling: Four Decades of Women in the Rabbinate, published in 2016.

== See also ==
- Timeline of women rabbis
- Women in Judaism
