= Chana Timoner =

American rabbi and military chaplain (1951–1998)

Rabbi Chana Timoner

Personal life
- Born: Carol Ann Surasky; August 24, 1951 New Haven, Connecticut
- Died: July 13, 1998 (aged 45) New Haven, Connecticut
- Spouse: Julian Timoner (m. 1970)
- Occupation: Military chaplain

Religious life
- Religion: Judaism

Chana Timoner (née Carol Ann Surasky; August 24, 1951 – July 13, 1998) was the first female rabbi to hold an active duty assignment as a chaplain in the U.S. Army, which she began in 1993.

== Early life and education ==
She was born in New Haven, Connecticut, the daughter of Abraham Surasky and Mary Rose Surasky (née Greenberg). Her paternal grandparents, Anna and Morris (Max), were Russian Jews who had immigrated in 1910. Her mother had joined the Canadian Army to fight in World War II in 1940, a year before the United States entered the war, and in 1941 her mother transferred to the newly organized Women's Army Corps of the United States. Chana Timoner married at 18, and had two children by the time she graduated from college, yet was unhappy and restless as a homemaker and mother.

== Rabbinical career ==
She began rabbinical studies in 1984 after a friend remarked one day, "you know, in 7 years you could be a 40-year-old housewife or you could be a 40-year-old rabbi." She became a Conservative Jewish rabbi, ordained in 1989. She joined the army in 1993, and on the very day that year that she began her first assignment, at Fort Bragg in North Carolina, President Clinton announced the Don't ask, don't tell policy in the military.

== See also ==
- Timeline of women rabbis
