= Julie Schonfeld =

American rabbi

Personal life
- Education: Yale University

Religious life
- Religion: Judaism

Jewish leader
- Position: Executive vice president / Chief Executive Officer
- Organisation: Rabbinical Assembly
- Began: 2008

Julie Schonfeld is the first female rabbi to serve in the chief executive position of an American rabbinical association, having been named the executive vice president of the Conservative movement's Rabbinical Assembly (RA) in 2008 and later as Chief Executive Officer of the RA until 2019.

She also was a member of the President's Advisory Council on Faith-Based and Neighborhood Partnerships.

Schonfeld was ordained by the Jewish Theological Seminary of America and also has a degree from Yale University.

During her leadership of the RA, the organization published Mahzor Lev Shalem (2010) and Siddur Lev Shalem (2016), both of which represented Conservative Judaism's efforts to balance its values of gender equality, diversity, and engagement with tradition in their prayer book.

In 2011, Jewish Women International named her one of "10 Women to Watch in 5772."

In 2012, she was part of a mission of religious leaders that went on a six-city tour to Indonesia, Jordan, the Palestinian Authority, and Israel to highlight the role of religion in advancing Middle East peace.

She opposed the controversial arrest of a woman for wearing a tallit at the Western Wall.

== See also ==
- Timeline of women rabbis
