= Rebecca Dubowe =

American deaf rabbi

- Born: Los Angeles, California, United States
- Education: University of Judaism; Hebrew Union College; Hebrew Union College – Jewish Institute of Religion
- Occupation: Rabbi

Rebecca Dubowe is the first deaf woman to be ordained as a rabbi in the United States.

== Life ==
Rebecca Dubowe was born in Los Angeles, and earned a B.A. in Jewish studies from the University of Judaism and an M.A. in Hebrew letters from Hebrew Union College. Rabbi Dubowe was ordained in 1993 by the American Reform seminary Hebrew Union College – Jewish Institute of Religion and served as Associate Rabbi from 1993 to 1997 at Anshe Emeth Memorial Temple in New Brunswick, New Jersey. In 1997, she joined Temple Adat Elohim in Thousand Oaks, California, where she worked as a rabbi. Since 2015, she has been the rabbi at Moses Montefiore Congregation in Bloomington, Illinois. Rabbi Dubowe also serves on the board of the Women's Rabbinic Network, the national organization for female Reform rabbis in America. During March and April 2010, she went on a national speaking tour to "share [her] sacred journey" and to educate others about the inclusion of people with disabilities in Jewish life and ritual. In 2010, the rabbi was also listed by The Sisterhood, The Jewish Daily Forward's women's issues blog, as one of 50 influential female rabbis in America. Rabbi Dubowe collaborated with Kalaniot Books in 2021 to introduce American Sign Language to the young readers of the Rabbi Kerry Olitzky picture book called The Candy Man Mystery.

== See also ==
- Timeline of women rabbis
