= Valerie Stessin =

Valerie Stessin is the first woman to be ordained as a Conservative rabbi in Israel, as well as the first woman to be ordained by the Schechter Institute of Jewish Studies; she was ordained in 1993.

She was born in France, and was involved with the Bnei Akiva youth movement there, but moved to Israel at age 17. In 2009 she and Rabbi Miriam Berkowitz founded Kashouvot, an organization in Jerusalem whose mission is to "introduce chaplaincy (also referred to as pastoral care or spiritual support) into Israel, and to provide quality, professional spiritual support in the healthcare and social services."

== See also ==
- Timeline of women rabbis
