= Alysa Stanton =

American rabbi

Rabbi Alysa Stanton
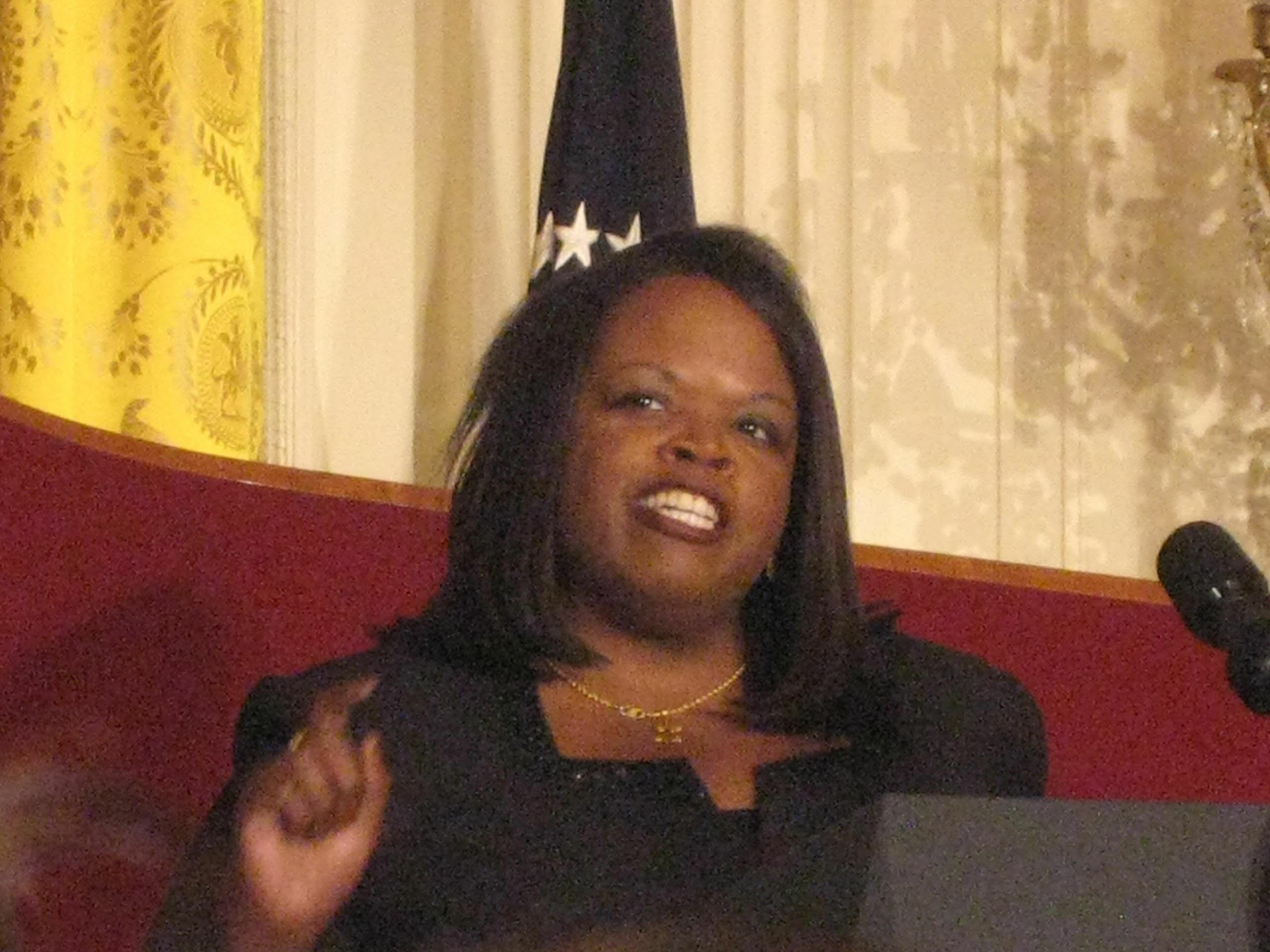
- Stanton at the White House

Personal details
- Born: August 2, 1963 (age 63) Cleveland, Ohio
- Education: Colorado State University; Hebrew Union College-Jewish Institute of Religion
- Occupation: Rabbi

Alysa Stanton (born August 2, 1963) is an American Reform rabbi, and the first African American female rabbi. Ordained on June 6, 2009, in August 2009 she began work as a rabbi at Congregation Bayt Shalom, a small majority-white synagogue in Greenville, North Carolina, making her the first African American rabbi to lead a majority-white congregation. Stanton converted to Judaism at age 24 and first studied and worked as a psychotherapist.

== Early life and education ==
Stanton was born in Cleveland, Ohio, and moved to Denver, Colorado, with her family at the age of 11. Although raised in the Church of God in Christ, when she was 24 Stanton converted to Judaism after considering several Eastern religions. She has said she was "born Jewish—just not to a Jewish womb". She earned her BA in psychology in 1988, an MA in education in 1992, from Colorado State University.

== Career ==
In her first career, Stanton was a psychotherapist. She specialized in grief counseling, and was asked to speak to people in Columbine after the 1999 high school massacre. Before preparing for the rabbinate, she sought to become a cantor, but heard that Jewish leadership positions were not available to women. When she finally saw a female cantor, she decided to pursue the studies necessary to become a rabbi.

Stanton graduated from Hebrew Union College-Jewish Institute of Religion, a Reform Jewish seminary. She has said that she is not concerned with being the first Black woman to become a rabbi, "I try not to focus on being the first. I focus on being the best—the best human being, the best rabbi I can be." "If I were the 50,000th, I'd still be doing what I do.... Me being first was just the luck of the draw."

In August 2009, Stanton became the rabbi of Congregation Bayt Shalom, a small majority-white synagogue in Greenville, North Carolina, making her the first African American rabbi to lead a majority-white congregation. During her time as the rabbi, Stanton expanded its b’nai mitzvah program and attracted new families to Bayt Shalom. The congregation's president said that the fact that Stanton is African-American and a woman had nothing to do with the decision to hire her: "I'm very proud of my community. [Stanton's being a woman or being Black] never came up in conversation. Obviously, we all know that's unusual but when she got on the pulpit during her visit, it was totally comfortable." In 2011, the congregation decided not to renew her contract, which expired July 31, 2011.

== See also ==
- Jewish African-Americans
- Timeline of women rabbis
