= Sandra Kviat =

English female rabbi from Denmark

Sandra Kviat became the first female rabbi from Denmark in 2011; she was ordained in England at Leo Baeck College. She is now a rabbi for Crouch End havurah in London. She has also been hired to advise on educational and other issues for the Liberal Judaism head office.

== See also ==
- Timeline of women rabbis
