= Tanya Segal =

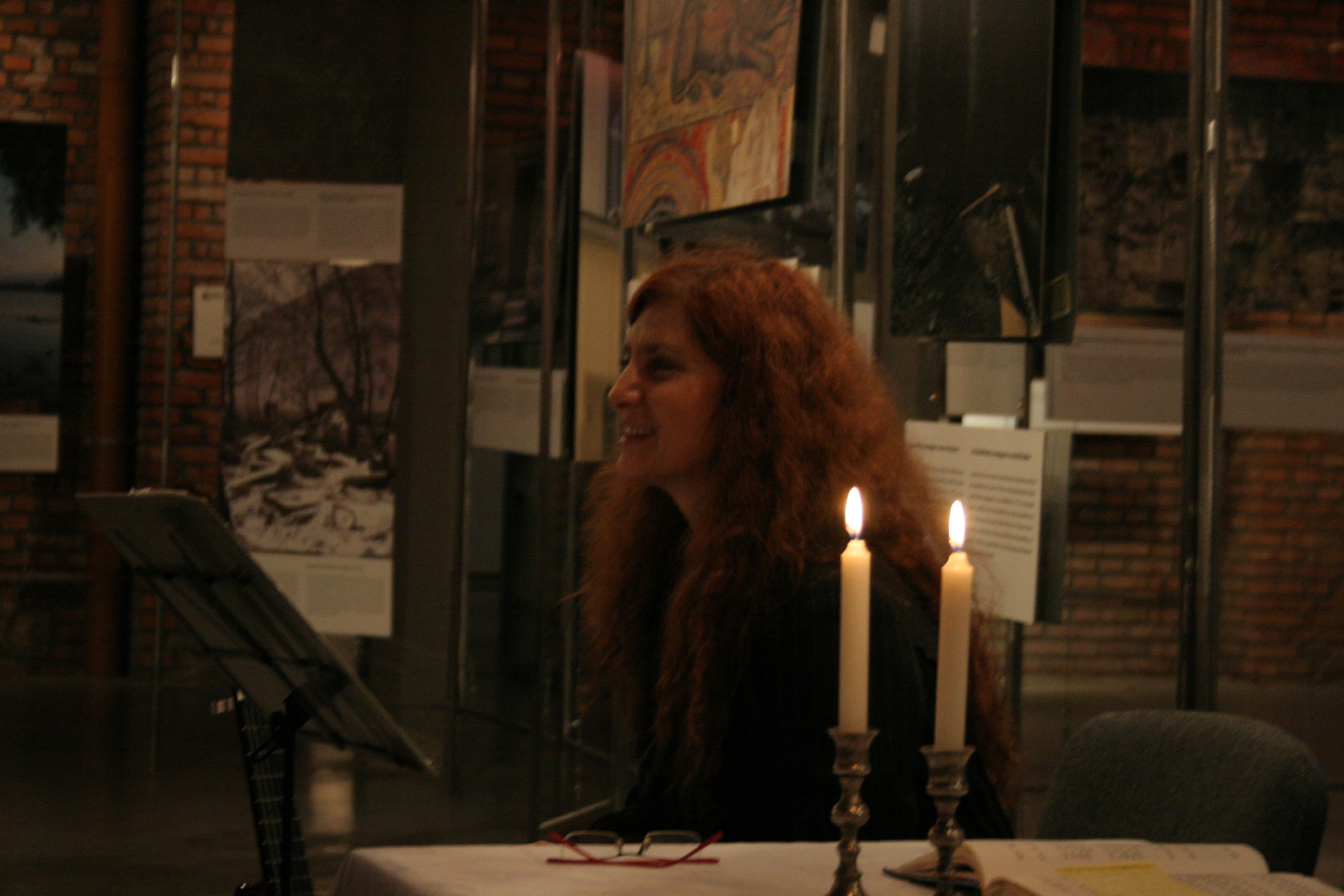
Tanya Segal

Tanya Segal (born 1957) an Israeli rabbi, is the first full-time female rabbi in Poland and the first female rabbi in the Czech Republic. Segal is also a professional theatrical director, actress, singer and guitar player.

== Biography ==
Segal was born in USSR (Moscow) in 1957. She made Aliyah to Israel in 1990, and was ordained to a rabbi in 2007 at the Hebrew Union College in Jerusalem (HUC). In 2006, her play And Her Name Was Heather was first performed, at the Hebrew Union College campus; it combines a commentary on the Book of Ruth with the story of American convert Tamar (Heather) Havilio. She also studied at Tel Aviv University, where she produced the master's thesis From Zoharic Text to Liturgical Performance: The Role of Weeping in the Performance of Eikha. While developing these works, she created the theoretical basis of the Midrash Theatre which she established in Kraków at 2008, one year later after her rabbinic ordination. The Midrash Theatre performances in Poland became the innovative form of study she constantly used in her rabbinical teaching practice. Today the Midrash Theatre under Tanya Segal's directing is a professional Jewish Theatre in Kraków opened for the public. In December 2007, she became the second rabbi (senior rabbi Burt Schuman) of Beit Warszawa congregation in Warsaw. Since 2009, she has been a rabbi at Beit Kraków, a Progressive Jewish community of Kraków. Since August 2019, she is a rabbi of the Jewish Community of Ostrava, Czech Republic.

== Other ==
The 2022 art exhibit “Holy Sparks”, shown among other places at the Dr. Bernard Heller Museum, featured art about twenty-four female rabbis who were firsts in some way; Linda Soberman created the artwork about Segal that was in that exhibit.

== See also ==
- Timeline of women rabbis
