= Michal Mendelsohn =

- Born: Michal Bernstein
- Occupation: Rabbi

Michal Mendelsohn (born Michal Bernstein) became the first presiding female rabbi in a North American congregation when she was hired by Temple Beth El Shalom in San Jose, California, in 1976.

She was ordained by the Hebrew Union College-Jewish Institute of Religion in 1975, the second Reform Jewish woman to be ordained. She then became the head of the University Programs department of the United Jewish Appeal. She served as rabbi of Temple Beth El Shalom from 1976 until 1978, when she left to attend the University of Santa Clara law school. In 1999 she became the rabbi for the Joliet Jewish Congregation, a non-denominational congregation in Illinois. In 2000 she left that congregation and became one of the founders of Congregation Ohr Chadash (New Light), also in Illinois. As of 2013 she is working on a memoir tentatively titled Rabbi, Your Cleavage is Showing. The title comes from 1977, when San Jose Mayor Janet Gray Hayes presented Mendelsohn with a key to the city, and someone attending the ceremony criticized the “clinginess" of Mendelsohn's dress.

She has also worked as an executive in a Fortune 500 company, as a university professor, as a manager for non-profit organizations, and as the executive director of an arts center.

== See also ==
- Timeline of women rabbis
