= Alona Lisitsa =

Rabbi

- אלונה ליסיצה

Personal life
- Born: 1971 (age 54–55) Kyiv, Ukraine

Religious life
- Religion: Judaism
- Denomination: Reform

Alona Lisitsa (Hebrew: אלונה ליסיצה; born 1971) is the first female rabbi in Israel to join a religious council. Although Leah Shakdiel, who was not a rabbi, joined the Yerucham religious council in 1988 after a Supreme Court decision in her favor, no female rabbi had joined a religious council until Lisitsa joined Mevasseret Zion’s in 2012. She was appointed to the council three years before that, but the Religious Affairs Ministry delayed approving her appointment until Israel’s High Court of Justice ordered it to.

Lisitsa was born in Kyiv, Ukraine, and is a Reform rabbi. She works at the Hebrew Union College-Jewish Institute of Religion in Jerusalem.

== See also ==
- Timeline of women rabbis
