= Helga Newmark =

Helga Newmark, née Helga Hoflich, (1932–2012) was the first female Holocaust survivor ordained as a rabbi.

== Biography ==
She was born in Germany, and was sent to the concentration camps of Westerbork, Bergen-Belsen, and Terezín (known in German as Theresienstadt Ghetto) in Czechoslovakia. She was freed at the age of twelve, and immigrated to America at the age of sixteen. When she had her first child, a daughter, she began to wonder how she would answer her daughter's questions about God. After considering several religions, she joined a Conservative synagogue, Temple Emanuel in Ridgefield Park, New Jersey. There she learned so much from the rabbi and his wife that she eventually became principal of the synagogue.

She was accepted to the Reform movement's Hebrew Union College - Jewish Institute of Religion on her second attempt, and was ordained in 2000 after eight years of study. She served as a rabbi at Barnert Temple in Franklin Lakes, New Jersey, for two years.

== Publications ==
She is the author of the book Letters to the Wise One: A Holocaust Survivor's Conversations with God, published in 2007.

== See also ==
- Timeline of women rabbis
