= Sandra Kochmann =

Brazilian rabbi

Sandra Kochmann (Hebrew: סנדרה קוכמן) is the first female rabbi to serve in Brazil, although she was born in Paraguay. She was ordained by the Conservative rabbinical school Seminario Rabinico Latinoamericano in 2000. In 2003 she began work as a rabbi in Brazil, specifically as an assistant rabbi at the largest synagogue in Rio de Janeiro, called Associação Religiosa Israelita. In 2004 she became the first female rabbi invited to the bimah at the Congregação Israelita Paulista, Brazil's largest synagogue, when she attended the Conference of the Jewish Communities of the Americas in São Paulo, where she was the only woman among 25 rabbis. In 2005 she moved to Israel, where she became the coordinator of the Kehillah "Masortit Mishpachtit beBeit HaKerem" in Jerusalem. In 2008 she was appointed as Masorti Olami's coordinator for weddings and giyur.

== See also ==
- Timeline of women rabbis
