= Antje Deusel =

Antje Deusel (born 1960 in Nuremberg) is the first German-born woman to be ordained as a rabbi in Germany since the Nazi era. She was ordained in 2011 by Abraham Geiger College, and as of 2013 has a part-time position at Or Chaim.

== Publications ==
- Anus-praeter complications. Dissertation. Erlangen / Nuremberg 1987 with Ortwin Beisbart (ed.): Memorial Book of the Jewish citizens of Bamberg. Victims of Nazi terror 1933–1945. White, Bamberg 2008, ISBN 978-3-940821-10-2
- My covenant, which ye shall keep it. Religious Legal and medical aspects of circumcision. Herder, Freiburg / Basel / Wien, 2012, ISBN 978-3-451-30612-9

== See also ==
- Timeline of women rabbis
