= Irene Muzás =

First woman ordained as a rabbi in Spain (born 1974)

Rabbi Irene Muzás

Personal life
- Born: 1974 (age 51–52) Barcelona, Catalonia, Spain
- Education: Autonomous University of Barcelona; International University of La Rioja; University of Potsdam

Religious life
- Religion: Judaism
- Denomination: Conservative Judaism

Jewish leader
- Position: Rabbi
- Synagogue: Atid synagogue of Barcelona

Irene Muzás Calpe (born 1974) is a Spanish philologist. In 2022 she was ordained the first woman rabbi in Spain.

== Early life and education ==
Muzás was born in 1974 in Barcelona, Spain. She graduated in English language and literature from the Autonomous University of Barcelona, where she also completed a postgraduate degree in English Literature, and has further studied classical philology at the University of Barcelona and east Asian culture and society at the Open University of Catalonia. She also got a master's degree in education from the International University of La Rioja. She has worked as translator and English and Latin language teacher.

== Ordination ==
She converted to Judaism in 2013, after having been fascinated by Judaism for years, studying Hebrew and attending a course on Jewish history and customs at the University of Barcelona. She joined the Atid community of Barcelona, from the Conservative Judaism denomination.

On 23 October 2022, she was ordained as Spain’s first female rabbi at the Zacharias Frankel College of the University of Potsdam, Germany, after defending her thesis on Lilith for the Jewish theology master's degree. In November 2022, Muzás took over as head of the Atid Synagogue in Barcelona following rabbi Stephen Berkowitz’s retirement.
