= Ariel Stone =

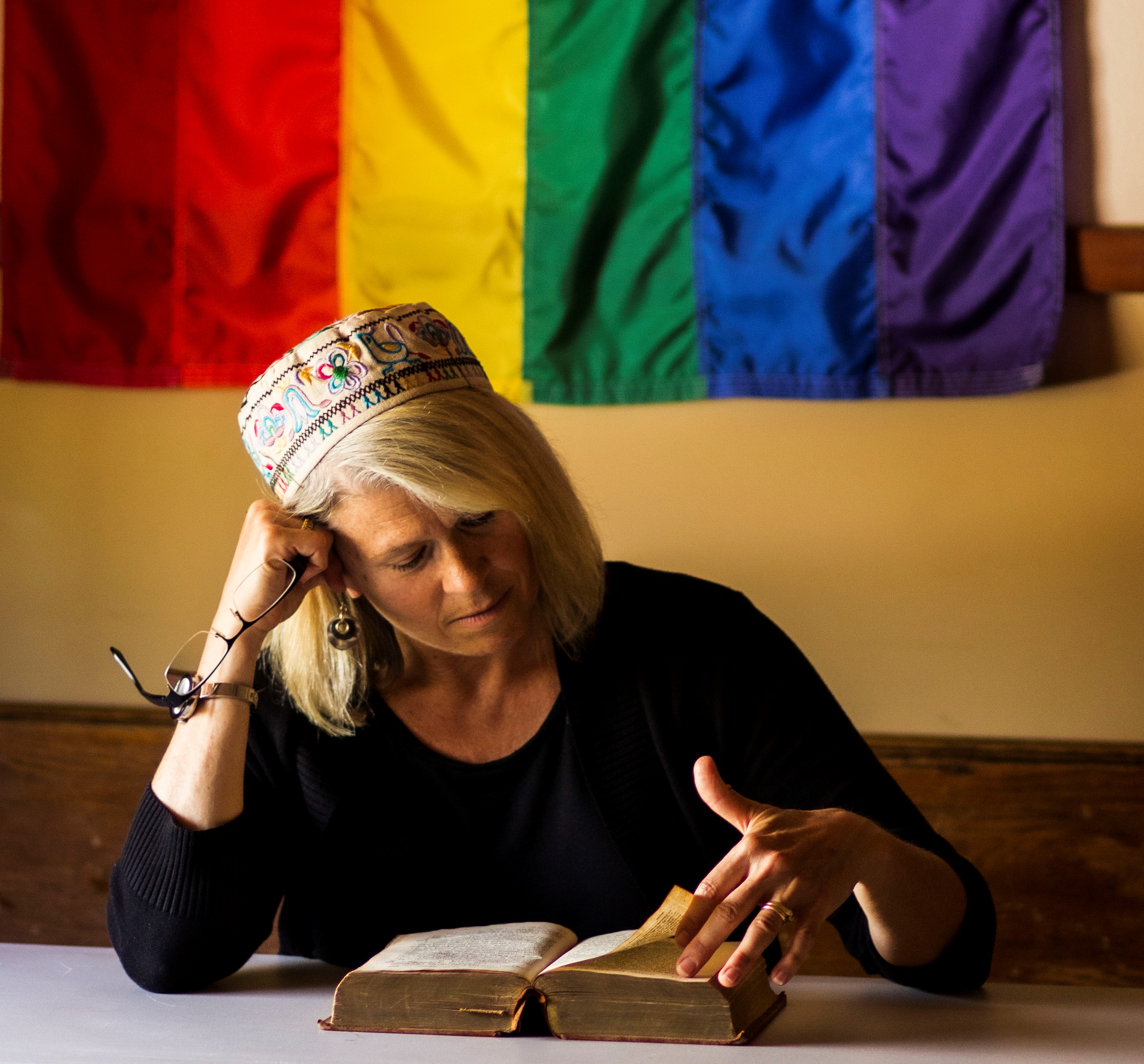

Ariel Stone, also called C. Ariel Stone, is the first American rabbi to lead a congregation in the former Soviet Union, and the first progressive rabbi to serve the Jewish community in Ukraine. After serving as Assistant Rabbi of Temple Israel of Greater Miami 1991 to 1993 with Rabbi Rex Perlmeter, she represented the World Union for Progressive Judaism in Ukraine from 1993 until 1994. While in Ukraine she was a rabbi at Congregation HaTikvah in Kiev, and helped in creating progressive congregations in Ukraine. In 1993-1994 she taught Holocaust studies at the University of Central Florida.

Since 2002, Ariel Stone has served as the spiritual leader of Congregation Shir Tikvah in Portland, Oregon. Stone has a master's degree in Hebrew Letters from Hebrew Union College-Jewish Institute of Religion, and was awarded a Doctor of Jewish Studies degree from Spertus Institute for Jewish Learning and Leadership in Chicago in 2010. As of 2018, she has served as adjunct faculty in the Religious Studies departments of Willamette University of Salem, Oregon, and Portland State University in Oregon. From 2007-2009 and again from 2015-2017 she was President of the Oregon Board of Rabbis.

She is the founder of the Portland Interfaith Clergy Resistance, a group of faith leaders committed to justice, compassion and accountability. The Portland Human Rights Commission awarded Ariel Stone the Emily G. Gottfried Lifetime Achievement Award in 2018.

Her books include "Because All is One" and "The Aleph Bet of Death, Dying as a Jew: A Guide for the Dying out of Traditional Sources."
