= Timeline of women's ordination =

This is a timeline of notable moments in the history of women's ordination in the world's religious traditions. It is not an exhaustive list of all historic or contemporary ordinations of women.

== Ancient history and Middle Ages ==
- 6th century BCE: Mahapajapati Gotami, the aunt and foster mother of Buddha, became the first woman to receive Buddhist ordination.

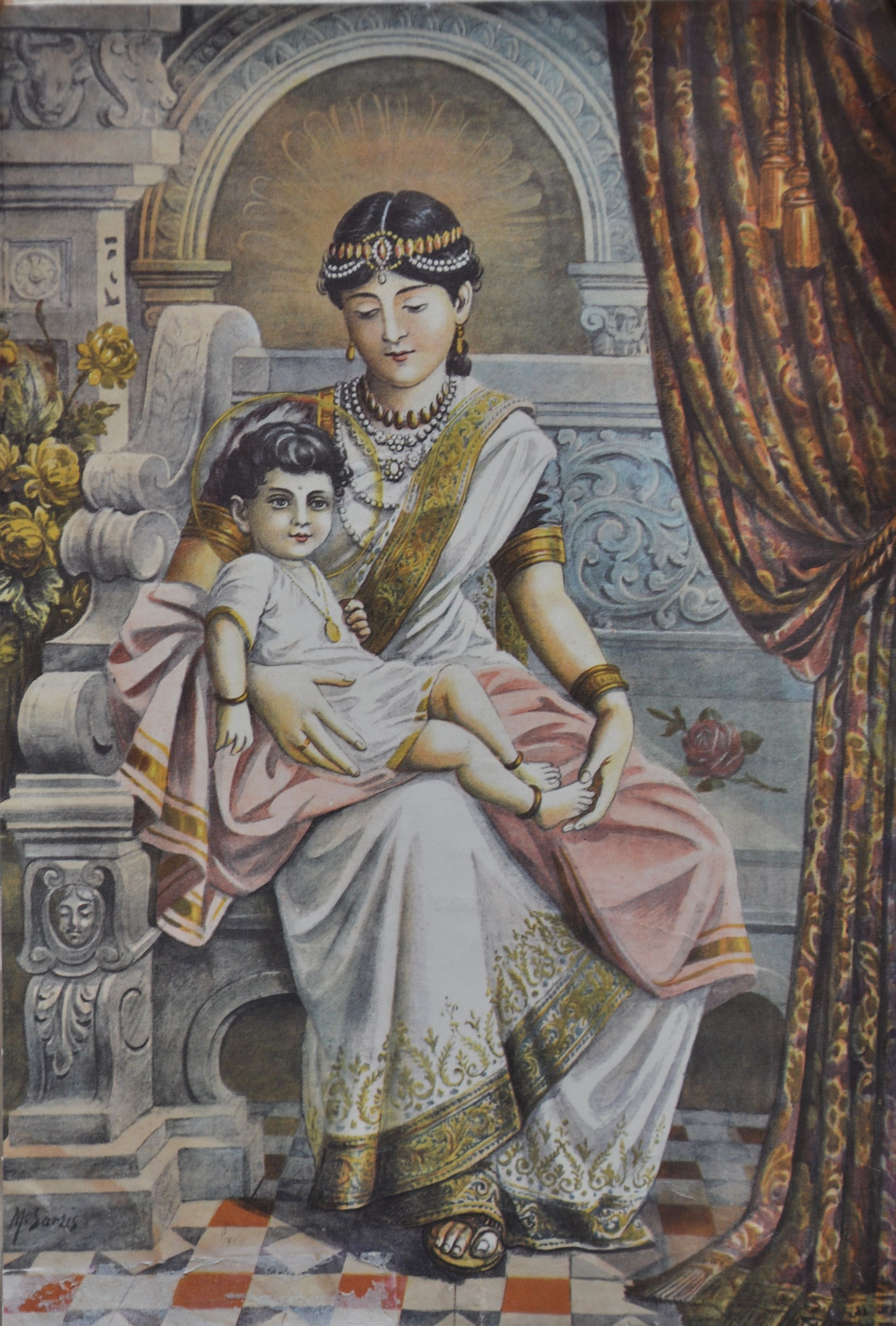
Prince Siddhartha with Mahaprajapati Gautami

== 19th century ==
- 1815: Clarissa Danforth was the first woman to be ordained by the Free Will Baptist denomination in New England.
- 1830: Emma Hale Smith was ordained by the Church of Christ (Latter Day Saints) in the United States. After she became President of the Relief Society in 1842, Joseph Smith declared that Emma had "previously been ordained to expound the scriptures".
- 1853: Antoinette Brown Blackwell was the first woman ordained as a minister in the United States. She was ordained by a church belonging to the Congregationalist Church. However, her ordination was not recognized by the denomination. She later quit the church and became a Unitarian. The Congregationalists later merged with others to create the United Church of Christ, which ordains women.
- 1861: Mary A. Will was the first woman ordained in the Wesleyan Methodist Connection by the Illinois Conference in the United States. The Wesleyan Methodist Connection eventually became the Wesleyan Church.
- 1862: Bishop of London licenses Elizabeth Ferard as the first deaconess in the Church of England. Ferard founded the North London Deaconess Institution.
- 1863: Olympia Brown was ordained by the Universalist denomination in 1863, the first woman ordained by that denomination, in spite of a last-moment case of cold feet by her seminary which feared adverse publicity. After a decade and a half of service as a full-time minister, she became a part-time minister in order to devote more time to the fight for women's rights and universal suffrage. In 1961, the Universalists and Unitarians joined to form the Unitarian Universalist Association (UUA). The UUA became the first large denomination to have a majority of female ministers.
- 1865: The Salvation Army was founded, which in the English Methodist tradition always ordained both men and women. However, there were initially rules that prohibited a woman from marrying a man who had a lower rank.
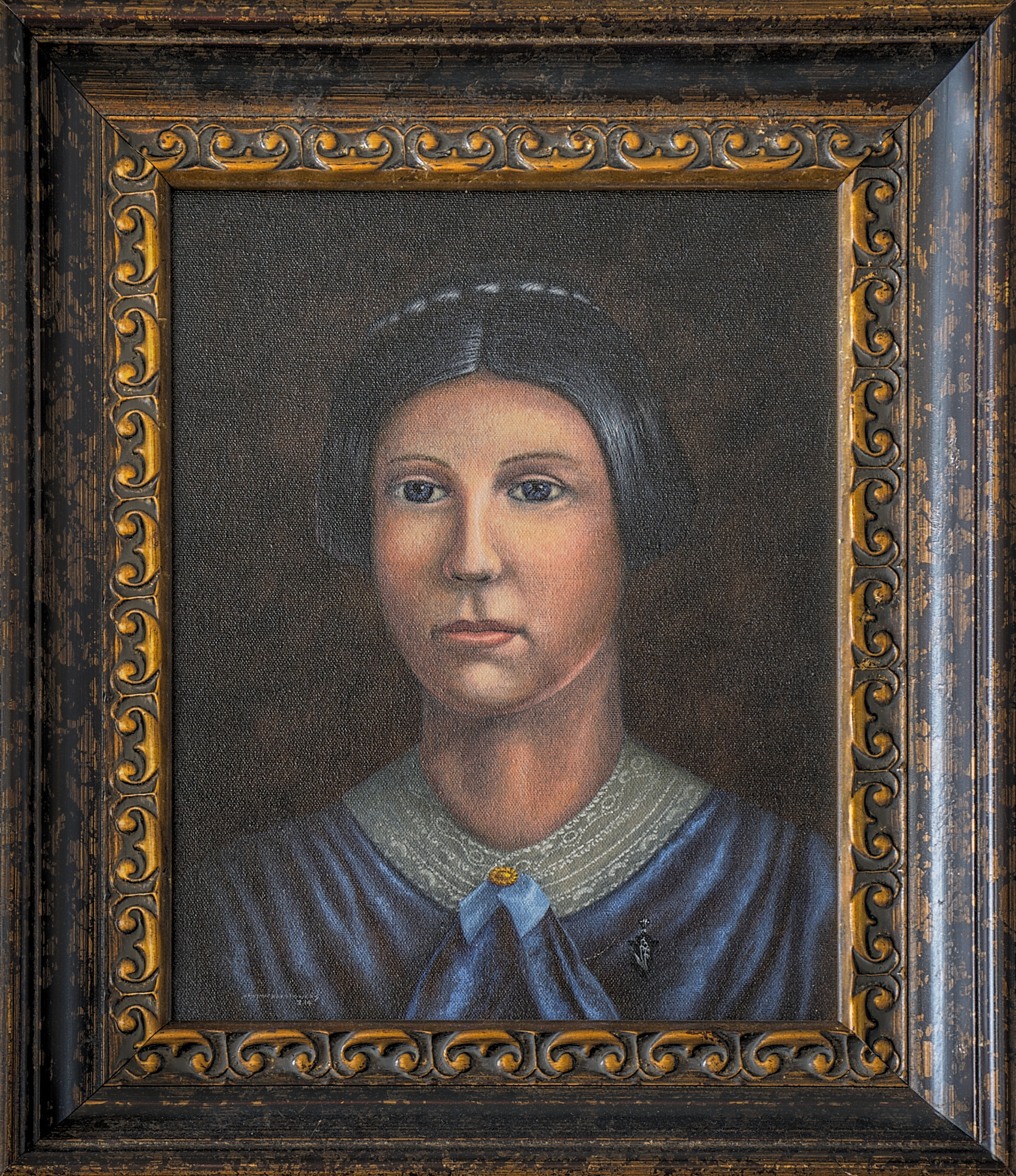
  Heleanor M. Davison, likely the first woman ordained in the Methodist tradition (1866)
- 1866: Helenor M. Davison was ordained as a deacon by the North Indiana Conference of the Methodist Protestant Church, probably making her the first ordained woman in the Methodist tradition.
- 1880: Anna Howard Shaw was the first woman ordained in the Methodist Protestant Church, an American church which later merged with other denominations to form the United Methodist Church.
- 1883: Ellen G. White was the first woman whose ministry was recognized as "ordained minister" in the Seventh-Day-Adventist Church by the Michigan Conference in the United States. She was also one of the founders of the Seventh-day Adventists.
- 1884: Marion Macfarlane became the first woman to be ordained as a deaconess in the Anglican Church in Australia, when she was ordained to the "Female Diaconate" in 1884 in the Diocese of Melbourne.
- 1888:
  - Fidelia Gillette served the Universalist congregation in Bloomfield, Ontario, during 1888 and 1889. She was presumably ordained in 1888 or earlier.
  - Lady Grisell Baillie (1822–1891) became the first deaconess in the Church of Scotland on 9 December 1888 in a service conducted by Dr James Mackenzie Allardyce at Bowden Kirk in Bowden, Scottish Borders.
- 1889:
  - The Nolin Presbytery of the Cumberland Presbyterian Church ordained Louisa Woosley as the first female minister of the Cumberland Presbyterian Church, USA.
  - Ella Niswonger was the first woman ordained in the American United Brethren Church, which later merged with other denominations to form the American United Methodist Church, which has ordained women with full clergy rights and conference membership since 1956.
- 1890: Mary Sterling was the first woman ordained as minister/pastor by the German Baptist Brethren/Brethren Church in America.
- 1892: Anna Hanscombe is believed to be the first woman ordained by the parent bodies which would form the Church of the Nazarene in 1919.
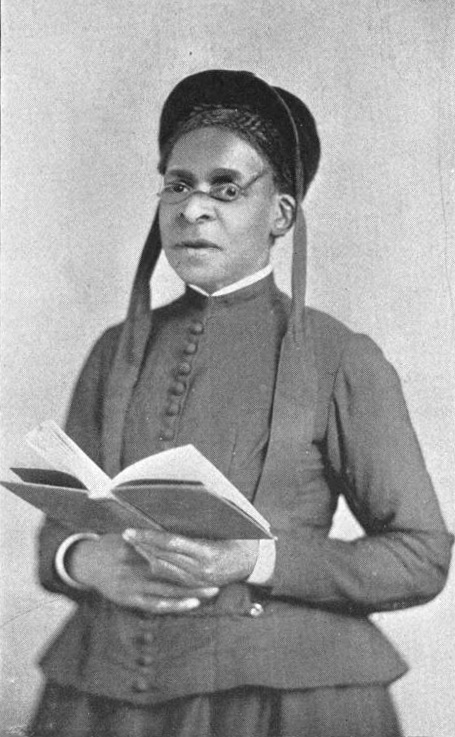
  Julia A.J. Foote, first woman ordained in the African Methodist Episcopal Zion Church (1894)
- 1894: Julia A. J. Foote was the first woman to be ordained as a deacon by the African Methodist Episcopal Zion Church.

== Early 20th century ==
- 1909: The Church of God (Cleveland, Tennessee) began ordaining women in 1909.
- 1911:
  - Ann Allebach was the first Mennonite woman to be ordained. This occurred at the First Mennonite Church of Philadelphia.
  - Anne Zernike was ordained as a church minister by the Mennonite Church in the Netherlands and became the first female church minister in the Netherlands and Europe.
  - St. Joan's International Alliance, founded in 1911, was the first Catholic group to work for women being ordained as priests.
- 1912: Olive Winchester, born in America, became the first woman ordained by any trinitarian Christian denomination in the United Kingdom when she was ordained by the Church of the Nazarene.
- 1914: The Assemblies of God was founded and ordained its first woman pastors in 1914.
- 1917: The Congregationalist Church (England and Wales) ordained their first woman, Constance Coltman (née Todd), at the King's Weigh House, London. Its successor is the United Reformed Church (a union of the Congregational Church in England and Wales and the Presbyterian Church of England in 1972). Since then two more denominations have joined the union: The Reformed Churches of Christ (1982) and the Congregational Church of Scotland (2000). All of these denominations ordained women at the time of Union and continue to do so.
- 1918:
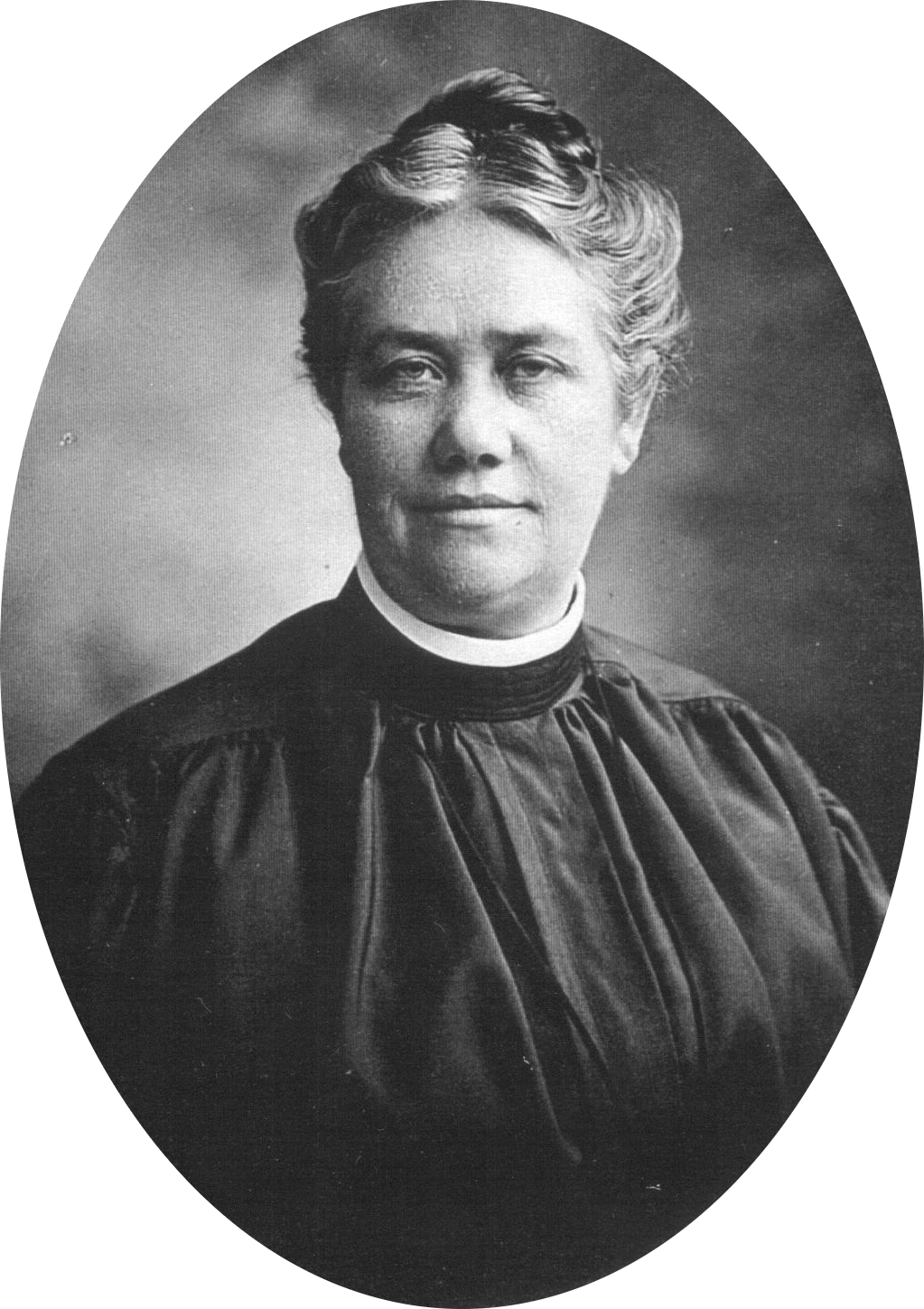
  Alma Bridwell White, first woman ordained as a bishop in the United States (1918)
  - Alma Bridwell White, head of the Pillar of Fire Church, became the first woman ordained as a bishop in the United States.
  - Rosa Gutknecht and Elise Pfister became the first two women in Switzerland to be ordained as pastors.
- 1920s: Some Baptist denominations started ordaining women.
- 1920: Riek Rappold became the first woman to be ordained by the Remonstrant Church in the Netherlands.
- 1922: The Jewish Reform movement's Central Conference of American Rabbis stated that "...woman cannot justly be denied the privilege of ordination." However, the first woman in Reform Judaism to be ordained, Sally Priesand, was not ordained until 1972.
- 1927: Winifred Kiek was the first woman to be ordained in the Christian ministry in Australia on 13 June 1927 in South Australia to the Congregational Union of Australia (now part of the Uniting Church in Australia).
- 1928:
  - A secular law was passed in Thailand banning women's full ordination in Buddhism; however, this law was revoked some time after Varanggana Vanavichayen became the first female monk to be ordained in Thailand in 2002.
  - Maude Royden began a year-long preaching and speaking tour of churches in the United States, New Zealand, Australia, Japan, China, Ceylon and India, promoting the ordination of women.
- 1929:
  - Maria Izabela Wiłucka-Kowalska was the first woman to be ordained by the Old Catholic Mariavite Church in Poland.
  - Jantine Haumersen became the first woman to be ordained as a pastor by the Evangelical Lutheran Church in the Netherlands.
  - Maude Royden co-founds the interdenominational Ministry of Women in the Church.
- 1930:
  - The Presbyterian Church in the United States of America ordained its first woman elder, Sarah E. Dickson.
  - Maude Royden founds the Anglican Group for the Ordination of Women.
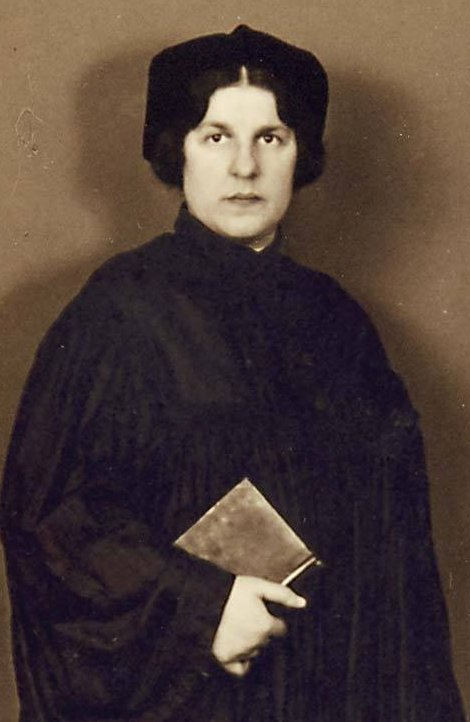
    Rabbi Regina Jonas, first woman ordained as a rabbi (1935)
- 1935: Regina Jonas was ordained privately by a German rabbi and thus became the first woman to be ordained as a rabbi.
- 1936: Sunya Gladys Pratt was ordained as a Buddhist minister in the Shin Buddhist tradition in Tacoma, Washington.
- 1940: Maren Sørensen became the first woman to be ordained in Denmark.
- 1943: Ilse Härter and Hannelotte Reiffen were ordained in the German Confessing Church (Bekennende Kirche), on 12 January 1943.
- 1944: Florence Li Tim Oi became the first woman to be ordained as an Anglican priest. She was born in Hong Kong, and was ordained in Guandong province in unoccupied China on January 25, 1944, on account of a severe shortage of priests due to World War II. When the war ended, she was forced to relinquish her priesthood, yet she was reinstated as a priest later in 1971 in Hong Kong. "When Hong Kong ordained two further women priests in 1971 (Joyce Bennett and Jane Hwang), Florence Li Tim-Oi was officially recognised as a priest by the diocese." She later moved to Toronto, Canada, and assisted as a priest there from 1983 onwards.
- 1947:
  - The Lutheran Protestant Church started to ordain women as priests.
  - The Czechoslovak Hussite Church started to ordain women.
- 1948:
  - The Evangelical Lutheran Church of Denmark started to ordain women.
  - The African Methodist Episcopal Church started to ordain women.
- 1949:
  - The Old Catholic Church (in the U.S.) began to ordain women.
  - Élisabeth Schmidt became the first woman to be ordained as a pastor of the Reformed Church of France.

== Late 20th century ==
=== 1950s ===
- 1954: Bé Ruys became the first woman to be ordained as a Dutch Reformed minister by the Dutch Ecumenical Congregation in Berlin, Germany.
- 1956: The Presbyterian Church in the United States of America ordained its first female minister, Margaret Towner.
- 1957: In 1957 the Unity Synod of the Moravian Church declared of women's ordination "in principle such ordination is permissible" and that each province is at liberty to "take such steps as seem essential for the maintenance of the ministry of the Word and Sacraments;" however, while this was approved by the Unity Synod in 1957, the Northern Province of the Moravian Church did not approve women for ordination until 1970 at the Provincial Synod, and it was not until 1975 that Mary Matz became the first female minister ordained within the Moravian Church.
- 1958: Women ministers in the Church of the Brethren were given full ordination with the same status as men.
- 1959: Ietske Jansen became the first woman to be ordained as a minister by the Dutch Reformed Church in the Netherlands.

=== 1960s ===
- 1960: The Evangelical Lutheran Church of Sweden started ordaining women as priests The three first women to be ordained were Elisabeth Djurle, Ingrid Persson and Margit Sahlin .
- 1961: Ingrid Bjerkås became the first woman to be ordained a minister of the Evangelical Lutheran Church of Norway.
- 1964: Addie Elizabeth Davis became the first Southern Baptist woman to be ordained. However, the Southern Baptist Convention stopped ordaining women in 2000, although existing female pastors are allowed to continue their jobs.
- 1965:
  - Rachel Henderlite became the first woman ordained in the Presbyterian Church in the United States; she was ordained by the Hanover Presbytery in Virginia.
  - Freda Bedi, a British woman, became the first Western woman to take ordination in Tibetan Buddhism.
- 1967: The Presbyterian Church in Canada started ordaining women.
- 1969: The first woman to be ordained as a minister in the Church of Scotland was the Revd Catherine McConnachie by the Presbytery of Aberdeen. She served as assistant minister at St George's Tillydrone, in Aberdeen.

=== 1970s ===
- 1970:
  - The Northern Province of the Moravian Church approved women for ordination in 1970 at the Provincial Synod, but it was not until 1975 that Mary Matz became the first female minister ordained within the Moravian Church.
  - On November 22, 1970, Elizabeth Alvina Platz became the first woman ordained by the Lutheran Church in America, and as such was the first woman ordained by any Lutheran denomination in America.
  - The first woman ordained by the American Lutheran Church, Barbara Andrews, was ordained in December 1970.
  - On January 1, 1988, the Lutheran Church in America, the American Lutheran Church, and the Association of Evangelical Lutheran Churches merged to form the Evangelical Lutheran Church in America, which continues to ordain women. (The first woman ordained by the Association of Evangelical Lutheran Churches, Janith Otte, was ordained in 1977.)
  - According to statements made in 1995 and later, the underground Catholic bishop Felix Maria Davídek, who was a friend of her family, secretly ordained Ludmila Javorová on December 28, 1970. Historians Fiala and Hanuš conclude that these women he ordained (there were about five, Javorová being the only publicly known) found very few specific sacerdotal tasks in Davídek's group, and conclude from this that their ordinations can therefore be considered as only a "symbolical act and a precedent".
- 1971:
  - Venerable Voramai, also called Ta Tao Fa Tzu, became the first fully ordained Thai woman in the Mahayana lineage in Taiwan and turned her family home into a monastery.
  - Joyce Bennett and Jane Hwang were the first regularly ordained priests in the Anglican Church in Hong Kong.
- 1972:
  - Freda Smith became the first female minister to be ordained by the Metropolitan Community Church.
  - Sally Priesand became America's first female rabbi ordained by a rabbinical seminary, and the second formally ordained female rabbi in Jewish history, after Regina Jonas.
- 1973: Emma Sommers Richards became the first Mennonite woman to be ordained as a pastor of a Mennonite congregation (Lombard Mennonite Church in Illinois).
- 1974:
  - The Methodist Church in the United Kingdom started to ordain women again (after a lapse of ordinations).
  - Sandy Eisenberg Sasso became the first female rabbi to be ordained in Reconstructionist Judaism.
  - Katie Cannon was ordained on April 24, 1974, in Shelby, North Carolina, by the Catawba Presbytery, in the Synod of Catawba, becoming the first African-American woman to be ordained in the United Presbyterian Church (US).
  - On July 29, 1974, Bishops Daniel Corrigan, Robert L. DeWitt, and Edward R. Welles of the Episcopal Church of the U.S., with Bishop Antonio Ramos of Costa Rica, ordained eleven women as priests in a ceremony that was widely considered "irregular" because the women lacked "recommendation from the standing committee," a canonical prerequisite for ordination. The "Philadelphia Eleven", as they became known, were Merrill Bittner, Alison Cheek, Alla Bozarth (Campell), Emily C. Hewitt, Carter Heyward, Suzanne R. Hiatt, Marie Moorefield, Jeannette Piccard, Betty Bone Schiess, Katrina Welles Swanson, and Nancy Hatch Wittig.
  - Auður Eir Vilhjálmsdóttir became the first woman to be ordained into the Evangelical Lutheran Church of Iceland.
- 1975
  - The Evangelical Lutheran Church of Latvia decided to ordain women as pastors, although since 1993, under the leadership of Archbishop Janis Vanags, it no longer does so.
  - Dorothea W. Harvey became the first woman to be ordained by the Swedenborgian Church.
  - Barbara Ostfeld-Horowitz became the first ordained female cantor in Jewish history.
  - Mary Matz became the first female minister ordained in the Moravian Church.
  - Jackie Tabick, born in Dublin, became the first female rabbi ordained in England.
  - George W. Barrett, a bishop of the Episcopal Church of the U.S., ordained four women in an irregular ceremony in Washington, D.C.; these women are known as the Washington Four.
- 1976:
  - The Anglican Church in Canada ordained six female priests.
  - Pamela McGee was the first woman ordained to the Lutheran ministry in Canada.
  - Karuna Dharma became the first fully ordained female member of the Buddhist monastic community in the U.S.
  - Episcopal Church laws were changed to permit women's ordination on September 16, 1976.
  - Since 1976, the denomination called the Evangelical Covenant Church has ordained and licensed women as ministers.
- 1977:
  - On January 1, 1977, Jacqueline Means became the first woman ordained to the priesthood in the Episcopal Church.
  - Pauli Murray became the first African American woman to be ordained as an Episcopal priest in 1977.
  - The Anglican Church in New Zealand ordained five female priests.
  - The first woman ordained by the Association of Evangelical Lutheran Churches, Janith Otte, was ordained in 1977.
- 1978:
  - Mindy Jacobsen became the first blind woman to be ordained as a cantor in the history of Judaism.
  - Lauma Lagzdins Zusevics was ordained as the first woman to serve as a full-time minister for the Latvian Evangelical Lutheran Church in America.
  - Marita Munro was the first woman ordained as a Baptist minister in Australia on 1 October 1978.
- 1979:
  - The Reformed Church in America started ordaining women as ministers. Women had been admitted to the offices of deacon and elder in 1972.
  - Earlean Miller became the first African-American woman ordained in the Lutheran Church in America (LCA), the largest of three denominations that later combined to form the Evangelical Lutheran Church in America.

==== 1980s ====
- 1981:
  - Lynn Gottlieb became the first female rabbi to be ordained in the Jewish Renewal movement.
  - Ani Pema Chödrön, an American woman, was ordained as a bhikkhuni (a fully ordained Buddhist nun) in a lineage of Tibetan Buddhism in 1981. Pema Chödrön was the first American woman to be ordained as a Buddhist nun in the Tibetan Buddhist tradition.
  - Karen Soria, born and ordained in the United States, became Australia's first female rabbi.
- 1983:
  - An Anglican woman was ordained in Kenya.
  - Three Anglican women were ordained in Uganda.
- 1984:
  - The Southern Baptist Convention adopted a resolution opposing women's ordination in 1984.
  - The Community of Christ (known at the time as the Reorganized Church of Jesus Christ of Latter Day Saints) authorized the ordination of women. They are the second largest Latter Day Saint denomination. A schism brought on by this change and others led to the formation of the Restoration Branches movement, the Restoration Church of Jesus Christ of Latter Day Saints and the Remnant Church of Jesus Christ of Latter Day Saints, all of which reject female priesthood, but not always the ordination of women in all contexts.
  - The Church of South India, since 1984, has allowed women's ordination.
- 1985:
  - According to the New York Times February 14, 1985 edition: "After years of debate, the worldwide governing body of Conservative Judaism has decided to admit women as rabbis. The group, the Rabbinical Assembly, plans to announce its decision at a news conference...at the Jewish Theological Seminary..." In 1985, Amy Eilberg became the first female rabbi to be ordained in Conservative Judaism.
  - The first women deacons were ordained by the Scottish Episcopal Church.
- 1986: The first women deacons were ordained in the Anglican Church of Australia.
- 1987:
  - The first female deacons were ordained in the Church of England.
  - Erica Lippitz and Marla Rosenfeld Barugel became the first two female hazzans (also called cantors) ordained in Conservative Judaism; they were ordained at the same time by the Cantors Institute of the Jewish Theological Seminary in New York City.
- 1988:
  - The Evangelical Lutheran Church of Finland started to ordain women.
  - Virginia Nagel was ordained as the first deaf female priest in the Episcopal Church.
- 1989: Einat Ramon, ordained in New York, became the first female native-Israeli rabbi.

==== 1990s ====
- 1990:
  - Pauline Bebe became the first female rabbi in France, although she was ordained in England.
  - Penny Jamieson became the first female Anglican diocesan bishop in the world. She was ordained a bishop of the Anglican Church in New Zealand in June 1990.
  - Anglican women were ordained in Ireland. Janet Catterall became the first woman ordained an Anglican priest in Ireland.
  - The Church of Ireland began ordaining women to the priesthood. The first two women so ordained were Kathleen Margaret Brown and Irene Templeton.
- 1991:
  - The Presbyterian Church of Australia ceased ordaining women to the ministry in 1991, but the rights of women ordained prior to this time were not affected.
  - The Cooperative Baptist Fellowship, which supports ordaining women, was founded in 1991.
- 1992:
  - Naamah Kelman, born in the United States, became the first female rabbi ordained in Israel.
  - In November 1992 the General Synod of the Church of England approved the ordination of women as priests.
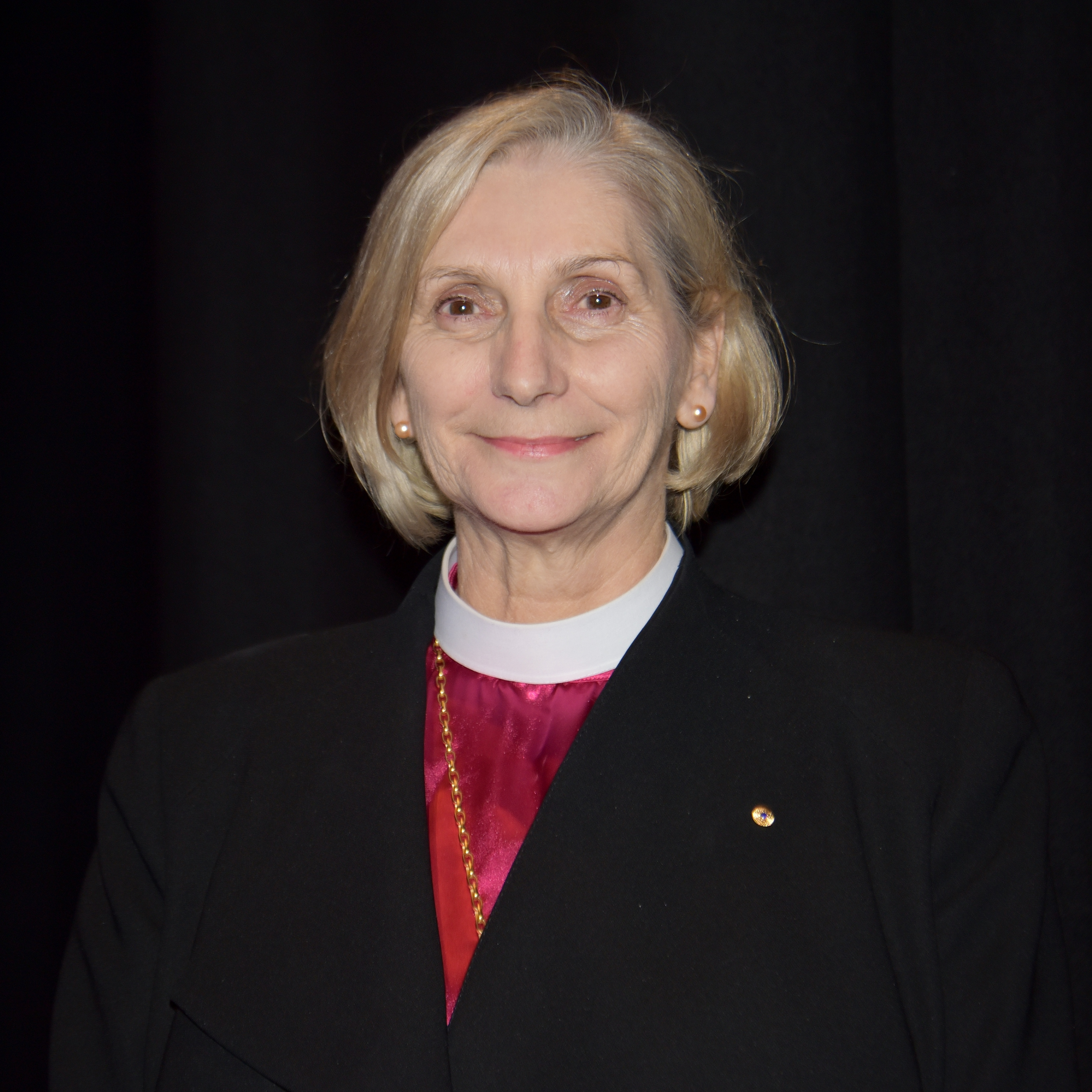
  - Her Grace The Most Reverend, Kay Goldsworthy, Archbishop of Perth, one of the first women in the Anglican Church of Australia to be ordained (1986) and the first woman to be ordained as an archbishop in the church (2018)
    In 1992 women were first ordained as priests in the Anglican Church of Australia
  - The Anglican Church of South Africa started to ordain women.
- 1993:
  - Rosemarie Köhn was bishop in Hamar diocese from 1993 to 2006. She was Norway's and the Nordic countries' first female bishop.
  - Rebecca Dubowe became the first deaf woman to be ordained as a rabbi in the United States.
  - The Communauté Evangélique Mennonite au Congo (Mennonite Evangelical Community of Congo) voted to ordain women as pastors.
  - Valerie Stessin became the first female Conservative rabbi to be ordained in Israel.
  - Leslie Friedlander became the first female cantor ordained by the Academy for Jewish Religion (New York).
- 1994:
  - Lia Bass was ordained by the Jewish Theological Seminary in New York, thus becoming the first Latin-American female rabbi in the world as well as the first woman from Brazil to be ordained as a rabbi.
  - The first women priests were ordained by the Scottish Episcopal Church.
  - Indrani Rampersad was ordained as the first female Hindu priest in Trinidad.
  - On March 12, 1994, the Church of England ordained 32 women as its first female priests.
- 1995:
  - The Sligo Seventh-day Adventist Church in Takoma Park, Maryland, ordained three women in violation of the denomination's rules – Kendra Haloviak, Norma Osborn, and Penny Shell.
  - The Evangelical Lutheran Church in Denmark ordained its first woman as a bishop.
  - In May 1995, Bola Odeleke was the first woman ordained as a bishop in Africa. Specifically, she was ordained in Nigeria.
- 1996:
  - Through the efforts of Sakyadhita, an International Buddhist Women Association, ten Sri Lankan women were ordained as bhikkhunis in Sarnath, India.
  - Gloria Shipp of the Gamilaroi nation was the first Aboriginal woman ordained as priest in the Anglican Church of Australia on 21 December 1996 in the Diocese of Bathurst.
- 1997: Chava Koster, born in the Netherlands and ordained in the United States, became the first female rabbi from the Netherlands.
- 1998:
  - The General Assembly of the Nippon Sei Ko Kai (Anglican Church in Japan) started to ordain women.
  - The Guatemalan Presbyterian Synod started to ordain women.
  - The Old Catholic Church in the Netherlands started to ordain women.
  - After 900 years without such ordinations, Sri Lanka again began to ordain women as fully ordained Buddhist nuns, called bhikkhunis.
- 1999:
  - The Independent Presbyterian Church of Brazil allowed the ordination of women as either clergy or elders.
  - Beth Lockard was ordained as the first deaf pastor in the Evangelical Lutheran Church in America.
  - Tamara Kolton became the first rabbi of either sex (and therefore, because she was female, the first female rabbi) to be ordained in Humanistic Judaism.
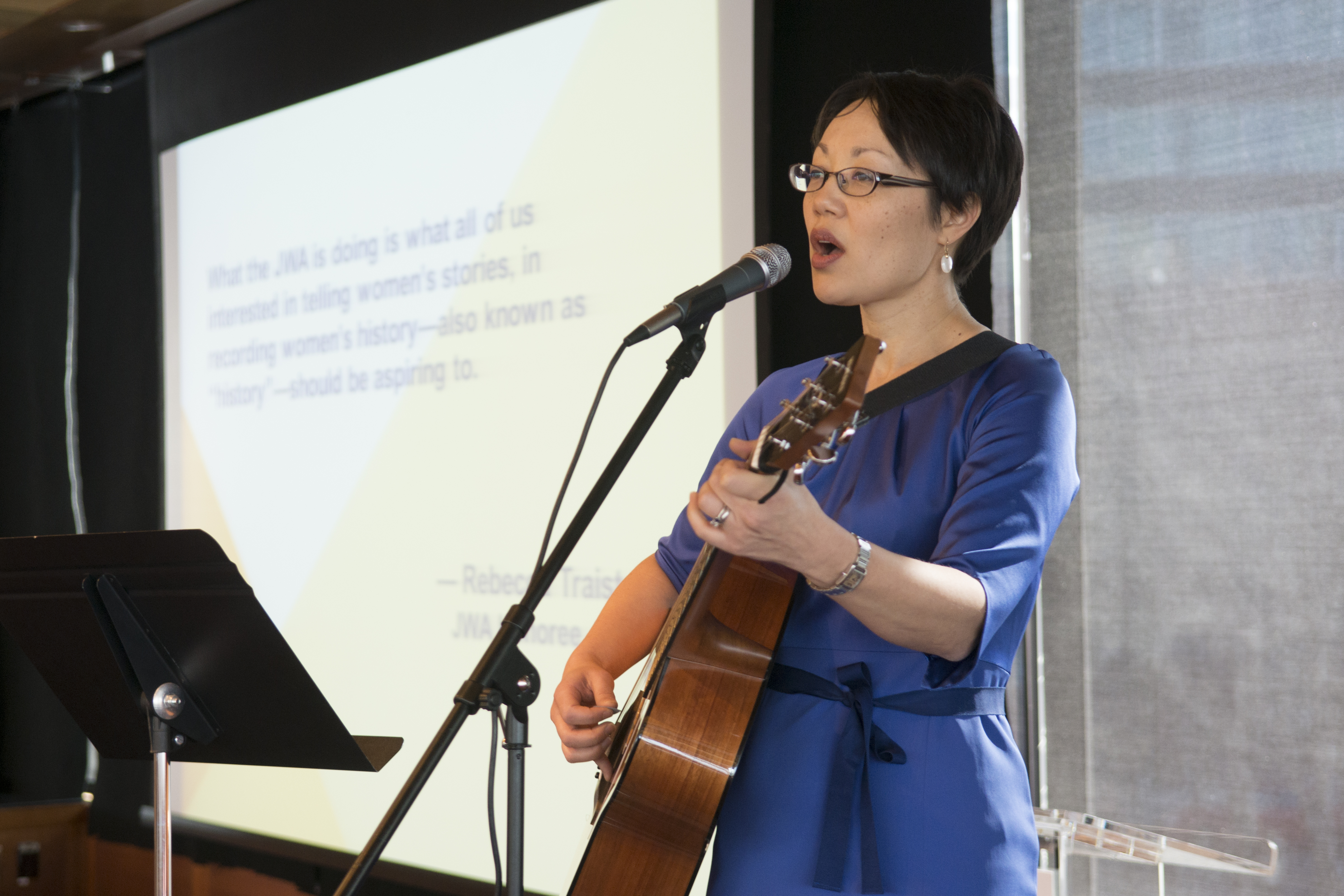
    Rabbi Angela Warnick Buchdahl, the first Asian-American woman cantor (1999) and rabbi (2001)
  - Angela Warnick Buchdahl, born in Seoul, Korea, became the first Asian-American person to be ordained as a cantor in the world when she was ordained by HUC-JIR, an American seminary for Reform Judaism.
  - The Anglican Diocese of The Bahamas and the Turks and Caicos Islands ordained Angela Palacious as the first Bahamian woman deacon.
  - Margot Käßmann became bishop of the Evangelical-Lutheran Church of Hanover.

== 21st century ==
=== 2000s ===
- 2000:
  - The Baptist Union of Scotland voted to allow their individual churches to make local decisions as to whether to allow or prohibit the ordination of women.
  - The Mennonite Brethren Church of Congo ordained its first female pastor in 2000.
  - Helga Newmark, born in Germany, became the first female Holocaust survivor ordained as a rabbi. She was ordained in America.
  - The Lutheran Evangelical Protestant Church (GCEPC) has ordained women since its inception in the year 2000.
  - The Mombasa diocese of the Anglican Church in Kenya began to ordain women.
  - The Church of Pakistan ordained its first female deacons. It is a united church which dates back to the 1970 local merger of Anglicans, Methodists, Presbyterians, Lutherans and other Protestant denominations.
  - The Anglican Diocese of The Bahamas and the Turks and Caicos Islands ordained Angela Palacious, who had been the first Bahamian woman deacon, as the first woman priest.
  - The African Methodist Episcopal Church elects and consecrates Vashti Murphy McKenzie as its first woman bishop.
- 2001:
  - Angela Warnick Buchdahl, born in Seoul, Korea, became the first Asian-American person to be ordained as a rabbi in the world; she was ordained by HUC-JIR, an American seminary for Reform Judaism.
  - Eveline Goodman-Thau became the first female rabbi in Austria; she was born in Austria but ordained in Jerusalem.
  - Bärbel Wartenberg-Potter became bishop of North Elbian Evangelical Lutheran Church
  - Brigitte Boehme became president of church committee of Bremen Evangelical Church
- 2002:
  - Marie Jerge became bishop in Evangelical Lutheran Church in America
  - Wilma Kucharek became bishop in Evangelical Lutheran Church in America
  - Sharon Hordes was ordained as Reconstructionist Judaism's first cantor in 2002.
  - The Danube Seven (Christine Mayr-Lumetzberger, Adelinde Theresia Roitinger, Gisela Forster, Iris Muller, Ida Raming, Pia Brunner and Angela White), a group of seven women from Germany, Austria, and the United States, were ordained on a ship on the Danube on 29 June 2002 by Rómulo Antonio Braschi, an Independent Catholic bishop whose own episcopal ordination was considered 'valid but illicit' by the Roman Catholic Church. The women's ordinations were not, however, recognised as being valid by the Roman Catholic Church. As a consequence of this violation of canon law and their refusal to repent, the women were excommunicated in 2003. Since then several similar actions have been held by Roman Catholic Womenpriests, a group in favor of women's ordination in Roman Catholicism; this was the first such action.
  - Khenmo Drolma, an American woman, became the first bhikkhuni (fully ordained Buddhist nun) in the Drikung Kagyu lineage of Buddhism, traveling to Taiwan to be ordained.
  - A 55-year-old Buddhist nun, Varanggana Vanavichayen, became the first female monk to be ordained in Thailand. She was ordained by a Sri Lankan woman monk in the presence of a male Thai monk. Theravada scriptures, as interpreted in Thailand, require that for a woman to be ordained as a monk, the ceremony must be attended by both a male and female monk. Some time after this, a secular law in Thailand banning women's full ordination in Buddhism, originally passed in 1928, was revoked.
  - Jacqueline Mates-Muchin was ordained by the Hebrew Union College-Jewish Institute of Religion in New York, becoming the first Chinese-American rabbi.
- 2003:
  - Ayya Sudhamma Bhikkhuni became the first American-born woman to gain bhikkhuni ordination in the Theravada school in Sri Lanka.
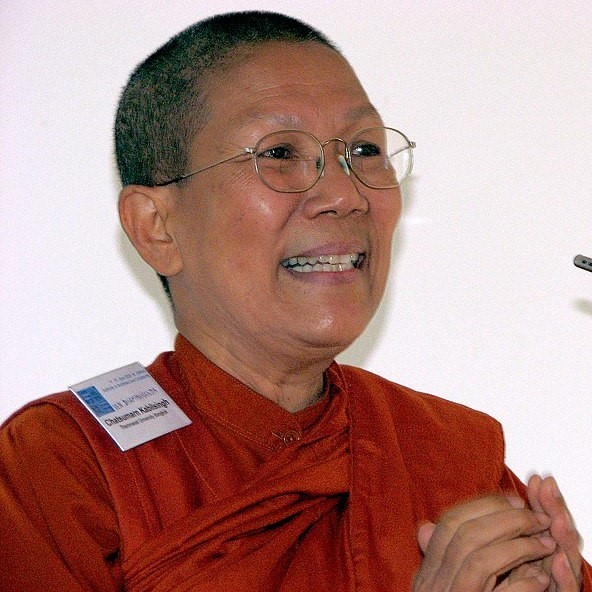
    Dhammananda Bhikkhuni, the first Thai woman to receive full ordination as a Theravada nun (2003)
  - On February 28, 2003, Dhammananda Bhikkhuni, formerly known as Chatsumarn Kabilsingh, became the first Thai woman to receive full ordination as a Theravada nun. She was ordained in Sri Lanka.
  - Sivan Malkin Maas became the first Israeli to be ordained as a rabbi in Humanistic Judaism; she was ordained by the International Institute for Secular Humanistic Judaism in 2003.
  - In the summer of 2003, two of the Danube Seven, Christine Mayr-Lumetzberger (from Austria) and Gisela Forster (from Germany), were ordained as bishops by several male bishops of independent churches not affiliated with the Vatican. These ordinations were done in secret and are not recognized as valid by the Roman Catholic Church. At the death of the male bishops, their identities will be revealed. Since then several similar actions have been held by Roman Catholic Womenpriests, a group in favor of women's ordination in Roman Catholicism; this was the first such action for women being ordained bishops.
  - Saccavadi and Gunasari were ordained as bhikkhunis in Sri Lanka, thus becoming the first female Burmese novices in modern times to receive higher ordination in Sri Lanka.
- 2004: Genevieve Benay (from France), Michele Birch-Conery (from Canada), Astride Indrican (from Latvia), Victoria Rue (from the USA), Jane Via (from the USA), and Monika Wyss (from Switzerland) were ordained as deacons on a ship in the Danube. The women's ordinations were not, however, recognised as being valid by the Roman Catholic Church. As a consequence of this violation of canon law and their refusal to repent, the women were excommunicated. Since then several similar actions have been held by Roman Catholic Womenpriests, a group in favor of women's ordination in Roman Catholicism; this was the first such action for female deacons.
- 2005: Annalu Waller, who had cerebral palsy, was ordained as the first disabled female priest in the Scottish Episcopal Church.
- 2006:
  - The Tamil Evangelical Lutheran Church ordained its first six female pastors.
  - Sharon Ballantyne was ordained as the first blind minister in the United Church of Canada.
  - Susan Wehle was ordained as the first American female cantor in Jewish Renewal in 2006; however, she died in 2009.
- 2007:
  - The 2007 synod of the Gereformeerde Kerken vrijgemaakt decided on 15–16 June 2007 to open all ecclesiastical offices to women.
  - The synod of the Christian Reformed Church voted 112–70 to allow any Christian Reformed Church congregation that wishes to do so to ordain women as ministers, elders, deacons and/or ministry associates; since 1995, congregations and regional church bodies called "classes" already had the option of ordaining women, and 26 of the 47 classes had exercised it before the vote in June.
  - Myokei Caine-Barrett, born and ordained in Japan, became the first female Nichiren priest in her affiliated Nichiren Order of North America.
  - Becky L. Savage was ordained as the first woman to serve in the First Presidency of the Community of Christ.
  - Kay Goldsworthy became the first woman to be consecrated as a bishop in the Anglican Church of Australia at St George's Cathedral, Perth, on 22 May 2008.
- 2009:
  - The first Bhikkhuni ordination in Australia in the Theravada Buddhist tradition was performed in Perth, Australia, on 22 October 2009 at Bodhinyana Monastery. Abbess Vayama together with Venerables Nirodha, Seri, and Hasapanna were ordained as Bhikkhunis by a dual Sangha act of Bhikkhus and Bhikkhunis in full accordance with the Pali Vinaya.
  - Alysa Stanton, born in Cleveland and ordained by a Reform Jewish seminary in Cincinnati, became the world's first black female rabbi.
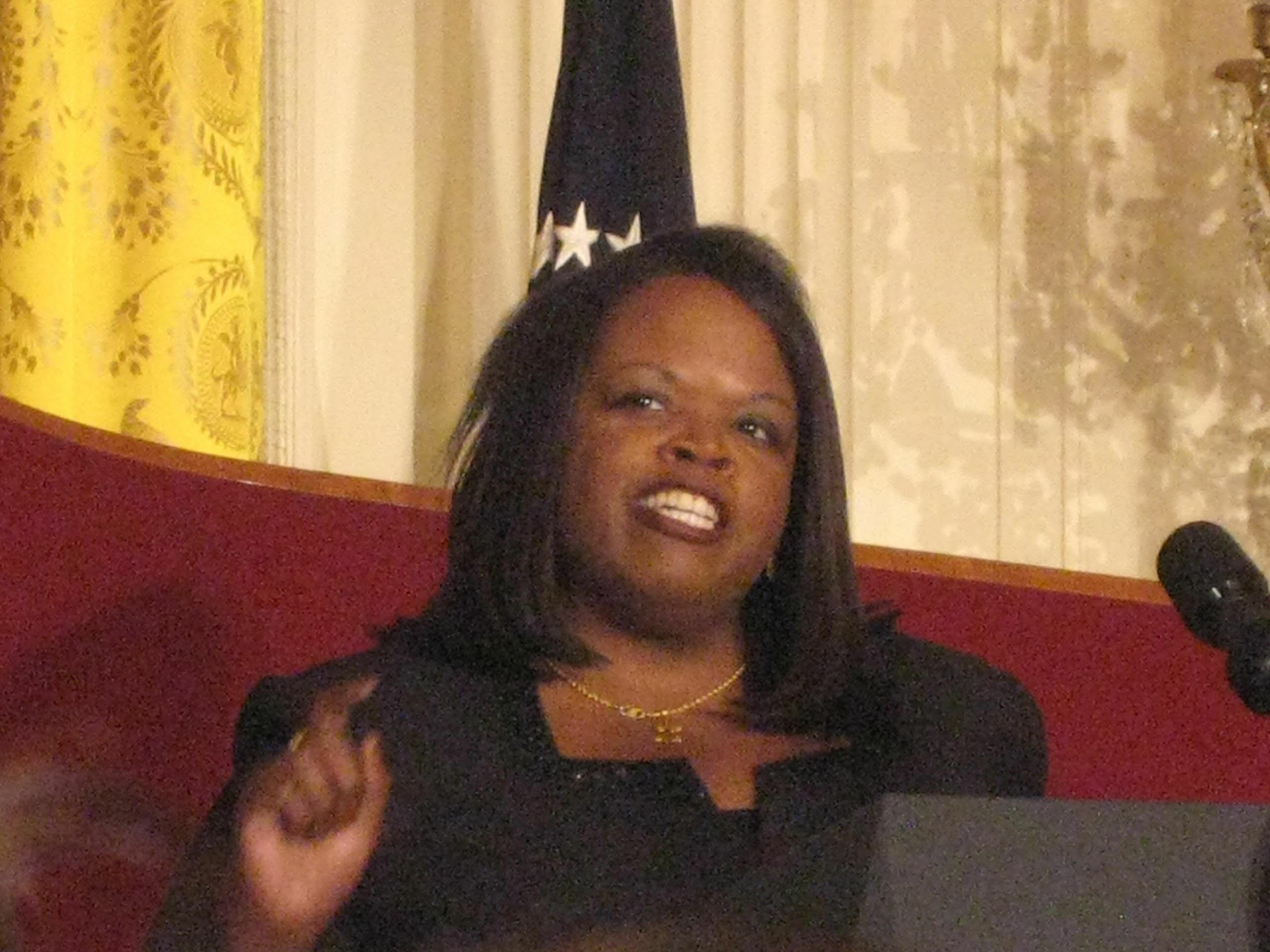
    Rabbi Alysa Stanton, the first Black female rabbi
  - Tannoz Bahremand Foruzanfar, who was born in Iran, became the first Persian woman to be ordained as a cantor in the United States.
  - On July 19, 2009, 11 women received semicha (ordination) as kohanot from the Kohenet Hebrew Priestess Institute, based at the Isabella Freedman Jewish Retreat Center, becoming their first priestess ordainees.
  - Ilse Junkermann became bishop of Evangelical Church in Central Germany

=== 2010s ===
- 2010:
  - Sara Hurwitz, an Orthodox Jewish woman born in South Africa, was given the title of "rabbah" (sometimes spelled "rabba"), the feminine form of rabbi. As such, she is considered by some to be the first female Orthodox rabbi.
  - For the first time in the history of the Church of England, more women than men were ordained as priests (290 women and 273 men).
  - The first American women to be ordained as cantors in Jewish Renewal after Susan Wehle's ordination were Michal Rubin and Abbe Lyons, both ordained on January 10, 2010. (Susan Wehle became the first American female cantor in Jewish Renewal in 2006; however, she died in 2009.)
  - Alina Treiger, born in Ukraine, became the first female rabbi to be ordained in Germany since World War II (the very first female rabbi ordained in Germany was Regina Jonas, ordained in 1935).
  - The first Tibetan Buddhist nunnery in America (Vajra Dakini Nunnery in Vermont), offering novice ordination in the Drikung Kagyu lineage of Buddhism, was officially consecrated.
  - In Northern California, 4 novice nuns were given the full bhikkhuni ordination in the Thai Therevada tradition, which included the double ordination ceremony. Bhante Gunaratana and other monks and nuns were in attendance. It was the first such ordination ever in the Western hemisphere. The following month, more full ordinations were completed in Southern California, led by Walpola Piyananda and other monks and nuns. The bhikkhunis ordained in Southern California were Lakshapathiye Samadhi (born in Sri Lanka), Cariyapanna, Susila, Sammasati (all three born in Vietnam), and Uttamanyana (born in Myanmar).
  - Delegates of the Fellowship of the Middle East Evangelical Churches unanimously voted in favor of a statement supporting the ordination of women as pastors during their Sixth General Assembly. An English translation of the statement reads, "The Sixth General Assembly supports the ordination of the women in our churches in the position of ordained pastor and her partnership with men as an equal partner in decision making. Therefore we call on member churches to take leading steps in this concern."
  - With the October 16, 2010, ordination of Margaret Lee, in the Peoria-based Diocese of Quincy, Illinois, women have been ordained as priests in all 110 dioceses of the Episcopal Church in the United States.
- 2011:
  - Sandra Kviat became the first woman from Denmark to be a rabbi; she was ordained in England.
  - Antje Deusel was ordained by Abraham Geiger College, thus becoming the first German-born woman to be ordained as a rabbi in Germany since the Nazi era.
  - One third of the Catholic theology professors in Germany, Austria, and Switzerland (144 people) signed a declaration calling for women's ordination and opposing "traditionalism" in the liturgy.
  - Mary Whittaker became the first deaf person to be ordained into the Church of Scotland.
  - The Anglican Diocese of Cyprus and the Gulf was allowed to ordain women as priests and appoint them to single charge chaplaincies. On June 5, 2011, Catherine Dawkins was ordained by the bishop of the Anglican Diocese of Cyprus and the Gulf, the Right Revd Michael Lewis, during a ceremony at St Christopher's Cathedral, Manama. This makes her the first female priest in the Middle East.
  - Stella Bentsi-Enchil, Alberta Kennies Addo, and Susanna C. Naana Ackun were ordained as the first female priests of the Anglican Church of Ghana.
  - The Evangelical Presbyterian Church's 31st General Assembly voted to allow congregations to call women to ordained ministry, even if their presbytery (governing body) objects for theological or doctrinal reasons. Such congregations will be allowed to leave the objecting presbytery (such as the Central South, which includes Memphis) and join an adjacent one that permits the ordination of women.
  - The American Catholic Church in the United States, ACCUS, ordained their first woman priest, Kathleen Maria MacPherson, on June 12, 2011.
- 2012:
  - Ann Svennungsen became bishop in Evangelical Lutheran Church in America
  - Ilana Mills was ordained, thus making her, Jordana Chernow-Reader, and Mari Chernow the first three female siblings in America to become rabbis.
  - Jo Henderson became the first Anglican priest to be ordained in the United Arab Emirates.
  - Eileen Harrop became the first woman from South East Asia (specifically, Singapore) to be ordained by the Church of England.
  - Amel Manyon became the first South Sudanese woman to be ordained in the Uniting Church in Australia.
  - Pérsida Gudiel became the first woman ordained by the Lutheran Church in Guatemala.
  - Mimi Kanku Mukendi became the first female pastor ordained by the Communauté Evangélique Mennonite au Congo (Mennonite Evangelical Community of Congo), although they voted to ordain women as pastors in 1993.
  - The Mennonite Church of Congo approved women's ordination.
  - Christine Lee was ordained as the Episcopal Church's first female Korean-American priest.
  - Alma Louise De bode-Olton became the first female priest ordained in the Anglican Episcopal Church in Curaçao.
  - On April 23, 2012, the North German Union of the Seventh-day Adventist Church voted to ordain women as ministers.
  - On July 29, 2012, the Columbia Union Conference of the Seventh-day Adventist Church voted to "authorize ordination without respect to gender."
  - On August 19, 2012, the Pacific Union Conference of the Seventh-day Adventist Church voted to ordain without regard to gender. Both unions began immediately approving ordinations of women.
  - Emma Slade, a British woman, became the first Western woman to be ordained as a Buddhist nun in Bhutan.
  - Annette Kurschus became praeses of Evangelical Church of Westphalia, Germany
- 2013:
  - On May 12, 2013, the Danish Union of the Seventh-day Adventist Church voted to treat men and women ministers the same, and to suspend all ordinations until after the topic was considered at the next GC session in 2015.
  - On May 30, 2013, the Netherlands Union of the Seventh-day Adventist Church voted to ordain female pastors, recognizing them as equal to their male colleagues. On September 1, 2013, a woman was ordained in the Netherlands Union.
  - On September 12, 2013, the Governing Body of the Church in Wales passed a bill to enable women to be ordained as bishops, although none would be ordained for at least a year.
  - The Anglican Synod of Ballarat voted to allow the ordination of women as priests.
  - Edda Bosse became president of church committee of Bremen Evangelical Church
- 2014:
  - Fanny Sohet Belanger, born in France, was ordained in America and thus became the first French female priest in the Episcopal Church.
  - The Lutheran Church in Chile ordained Rev. Hanna Schramm, born in Germany, as its first female pastor.
  - The Bishop of Basel, Felix Gmür, allowed the Basel Catholic church corporations, which are officially only responsible for church finances, to formulate an initiative appealing for equality between men and women in ordination to the priesthood.
  - The Association of Catholic Priests in Ireland stated that the Catholic church must ordain women and allow priests to marry in order to survive.
  - The first ever book of halachic decisions written by women who were ordained to serve as poskim (Idit Bartov and Anat Novoselsky) was published. The women were ordained by the municipal chief rabbi of Efrat, Rabbi Shlomo Riskin, after completing Midreshet Lindenbaum women's college's five-year ordination course in advanced studies in Jewish law, as well as passing examinations equivalent to the rabbinate's requirement for men.
  - The General Synod of the Church of England voted to allow for the ordination of women as bishops.
- 2015:
  - Mira Rivera became the first Filipino-American woman to be ordained as a rabbi.
  - Libby Lane became the first woman ordained as a bishop of the Church of England.
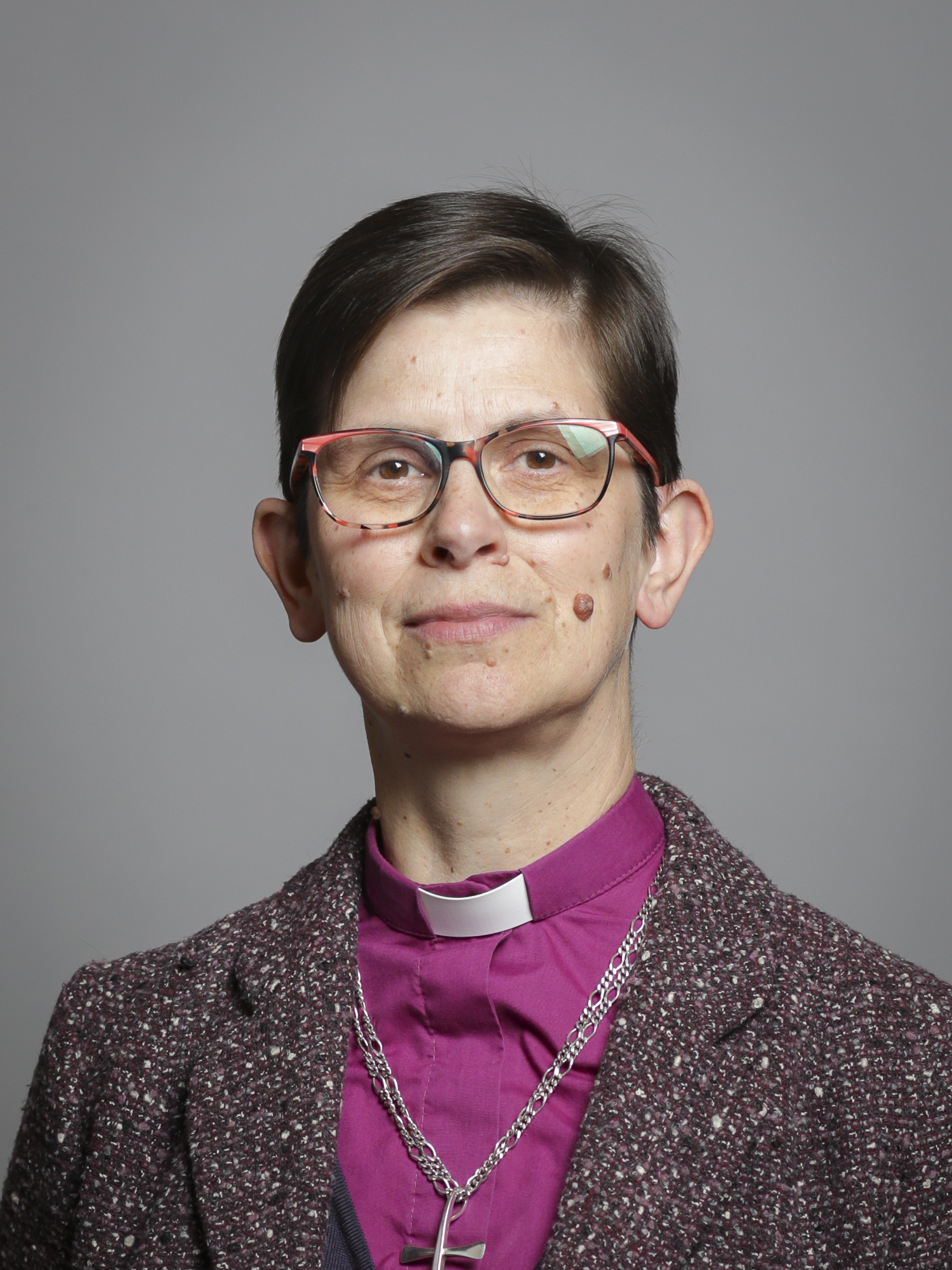
    The Right Reverend Libby Lane, Bishop of Derby, the first woman to be appointed as a bishop by the Church of England
  - The first bhikkhuni ordination in Germany, the Theravada bhikkhuni ordination of German nun Samaneri Dhira, occurred on June 21, 2015, at Anenja Vihara.
  - The first Theravada ordination of bhikkhunis in Indonesia after more than a thousand years occurred at Wisma Kusalayani in Lembang, Bandung. Those ordained included Vajiradevi Sadhika Bhikkhuni from Indonesia, Medha Bhikkhuni from Sri Lanka, Anula Bhikkhuni from Japan, Santasukha Santamana Bhikkhuni from Vietnam, Sukhi Bhikkhuni and Sumangala Bhikkhuni from Malaysia, and Jenti Bhikkhuni from Australia.
  - In the GC session in Dallas on July 9, 2015, Seventh-day Adventists voted not to allow their regional church bodies to ordain women pastors.
  - Bolivia became the first diocese in the Anglican Province of South America (formerly known as the Southern Cone) to ordain women as priests.
  - The Rev. Susana Lopez Lerena, the Rev. Cynthia Myers Dickin and the Rev. Audrey Taylor Gonzalez became the first women Anglican priests ordained in the diocese of Uruguay.
  - Yaffa Epstein was ordained as Rabba by the Yeshivat Maharat.
  - Lila Kagedan was ordained as Rabbi by the Yeshivat Maharat, making her their first graduate to take the title Rabbi.
  - The Rabbinical Council of America passed a resolution which states, "RCA members with positions in Orthodox institutions may not ordain women into the Orthodox rabbinate, regardless of the title used; or hire or ratify the hiring of a woman into a rabbinic position at an Orthodox institution; or allow a title implying rabbinic ordination to be used by a teacher of Limudei Kodesh in an Orthodox institution."
  - The Agudath Israel of America denounced moves to ordain women, and went even further, declaring Yeshivat Maharat, Yeshivat Chovevei Torah, Open Orthodoxy, and other affiliated entities to be similar to other dissident movements throughout Jewish history in having rejected basic tenets of Judaism.
- 2016:
  - After four years of deliberation, Hebrew Union College – Jewish Institute of Religion decided to give women a choice of wording on their ordination certificates beginning in 2016, including the option to have the same wording as men. Up until then, male candidates' certificates identified them by the Reform movement's traditional "morenu harav," or "our teacher the rabbi," while female candidates' certificates only used the term "rav u’morah," or "rabbi and teacher."
  - The highest governing body of the Evangelical Lutheran Church of Latvia amended the church rules, officially establishing that only men can be ordained as priests.
  - The Greek Orthodox Patriarchate of Alexandria and all Africa ordained six sub-deaconesses in the Democratic Republic of Congo.
- 2017:
  - Keshira haLev Fife was ordained by the Kohenet Hebrew Priestess Institute, thus becoming Australia's first Hebrew Priestess.
  - Ruti Regan became the first openly autistic person to be ordained by the Jewish Theological Seminary of America.
- 2018:
  - Lauren Tuchman was ordained by the Jewish Theological Seminary of America and thus became the first ordained blind female rabbi.
  - Denise Donato was ordained as the first female bishop in the Ecumenical Catholic Communion.
  - The Evangelical Lutheran Church in Thailand had its first women ordained into ministry, namely Jongkolnee Sampachanyanon Sim and Somporn Kulachote.
  - Dina Brawer, born in Italy but living in Britain, was ordained by Yeshivat Maharat and thus became Britain's first female Orthodox rabbi; she chose the title "rabba", the feminine form of rabbi.
  - Kay Goldsworthy was elected Archbishop of the Anglican Diocese of Perth in 2017 and installed on 10 February 2018 as the Archbishop and Metropolitan of Western Australia.
- 2019:
  - Regina Hassanally became bishop in Evangelical Lutheran Church in America.
  - Beate Hofmann became bishop of Evangelical Church of Hessen Electorate-Waldeck, Germany.

=== 2020s ===
- 2020:
  - The Church of Sweden had more female than male priests for the first time.
  - The Anglican Diocese of Cape Coast ordained its first female priest, Vida Gyabeng Frimpong.
- 2021:
  - Susanne Bei der Wieden became bishop of the Evangelical Reformed Church in Germany.
  - Dorothee Wüst became bishop of the Evangelical Church of the Palatinate.
- 2022:
  - The Evangelical Church of the Augsburg Confession in Poland ordained women as pastors for the first time.
  - The Rocky Mountain Conference (RMC) of the Seventh-day Adventist Church approved ordaining women pastors.
  - Lorita Packwood and Jennie Foster Skelton were ordained as the first female deacons in the Anglican Church of Bermuda, the first time that women had been ordained by the church for ministry.
  - The official lineage of Tibetan Buddhist bhikkhunis recommenced on 23 June 2022 in Bhutan when 144 nuns, most of them Butanese, were fully ordained.
  - Heike Springhart became bishop of the Evangelical Regional Church in Baden, Germany.
  - Archbishop Loveth Phil Daniels was selected to lead women from Nigeria by the leaders of the Kingdom Global College of Apostles and Bishops (KIGCOAB).
- 2023:
  - Sally Azar was ordained on January 22, 2023, by the Evangelical Lutheran Church in Jordan and the Holy Land in a ceremony at the Church of the Redeemer in Jerusalem, making her the first female Palestinian pastor in the Holy Land.
  - In June 2023, the Christian and Missionary Alliance of the United States approved women being ordained as pastors, but only if the women's local church leadership approves, and never as senior or lead pastors.
  - The Church of the Province of Central Africa approved the ordination of women to the diaconate and to the priesthood, allowing each diocese to decide whether or not to ordain women.
  - Kirsten Fehrs became bishop of the Evangelical Lutheran Church in Northern Germany.
- 2024
  - The Greek Orthodox Patriarchate of Alexandria and all Africa ordained its first female deacon, Angelic Molen, in Zimbabwe, making her the first female deacon in the Eastern Orthodox Church.
  - The Synod of the Anglican Diocese of Tabora in the Anglican Church of Tanzania voted to allow the ordination of women priests.
  - The Synod of the Lutheran Church of Australia enabled the ordination of women as pastors.
  - Shoshana Nambi, born in Kenya, became the first female rabbi from Uganda; she was ordained by the Hebrew Union College – Jewish Institute of Religion in New York.
  - Trijnie Bouw became president of the synode of the Protestant Church in the Netherlands.
- 2025
  - Christiane Tietz became the church president of Evangelical Church in Hessen and Nassau, Germany.
  - Katrina Foster became the first woman and the first openly gay bishop of the Metropolitan New York Synod of the Evangelical Lutheran Church in America.
  - The Lutheran Church of Australia ordained its first female pastor, Maria Rudolph.
  - The first female deacons in the Anglican Diocese of Botswana were ordained.
  - The International Israelite Board of Rabbis voted to allow women to be ordained as rabbis, and women rabbis joined the board. However, the board also ruled that when women rabbis are considered ritually impure (for example, during menstruation or after childbirth) others must do their religious duties.
- 2026
  - 28 January: Sarah Mullally became the 106th Archbishop of Canterbury of the Church of England, the first woman to hold this position.
  - 17 May: The first female priests in the Anglican Diocese of Botswana were ordained; as such, they were also the first female priests ordained in the Church of the Province of Central Africa. The first of the women to be ordained that day was the Revd Beauty Autlwetse.
  - Christina-Maria Bammel was elected Lutheran bishop of the Evangelical Lutheran Church in Brunswick, Germany.

== See also ==
- Bhikkhunī
- List of female Anglican bishops
- List of ordained Christian women
- List of the first 32 women ordained as Church of England priests
- List of the first women ordained as priests in the Anglican Church of Australia in 1992
- List of women bishops in the Anglican Church of Australia
- List of women priests
- Timeline of women in religion
- Timeline of women rabbis
- Women in Buddhism
- Women rabbis and Torah scholars
