= List of Swedish clergy and theologians =

This is a list of Swedish clergy and theologians.

== Bishops ==
- Mikael Agricola, bishop and reformer
- Hans Brask, bishop
- Bishop Henry, bishop
- Lars Levi Laestadius, founder of the Laestadian movement
- Christina Odenberg, first woman to become a bishop in the Church of Sweden
- Laurentius Petri, archbishop and reformer
- Olaus Petri, reformer
- Nathan Söderblom, archbishop, Nobel Peace Prize laureate

== Other clergy ==
- Israel Acrelius (1714–1800), pastor in Rialla, Wilmington, Delaware, and Fellingsboro
- Johan Campanius (1601–1683), clergyman assigned to New Sweden, translated the Lutheran Catechism into the Lenape language
- Elisabeth Djurle, one of the first three women to be ordained as priests of the Church of Sweden
- Israel Israelsson Näslund III (1796–1858), pastor at Torsåker
- Ingrid Persson (1912–2000), one of the first three women to be ordained as priests of the Church of Sweden
- Lewi Pethrus (1884–1974), founder of the Swedish Pentecostal movement
- Margit Sahlin (1914–2003), one of the first three women to be ordained as priests of the Church of Sweden
- Reorus Torkillus (1608–1643), first Lutheran clergyman assigned to New Sweden

== See also ==
- Church of Sweden
- Roman Catholic Church
- Archbishop of Uppsala
- Bishop of Åbo
- Ansgar – bishop and missionary to Sweden
- List of Swedish saints
