= Élisabeth Schmidt =

French protestant pastor

Élisabeth Schmidt (1908–1986) was a French protestant pastor. She was the first woman to enter the priesthood of the Reformed Church of France when the parish of Sète requested her ordination in 1949. She is also remembered for her pioneering parochial work in Blida, Algeria, from 1958 to 1962.

== Biography ==
Born on 31 May 1908 in Paris, Élisabeth Schmidt was the daughter of the French politician Henri Schmidt (1874–1954) and Angèle Kilbourg, who taught German. Brought up in the Vosges where her father was serving as a deputy, she accompanied her mother to Switzerland where she was receiving medical attention. It was there that she first became interested in the Bible and the Christian faith. On returning to France, she was baptised in Sèvres in 1923.

After successfully completing her school education, she first studied philosophy at the Sorbonne where she came in contact with Suzanne de Dietrich, Charles Westphal and Claire Julien of the World Student Christian Federation who deepened her interest in the church. Convinced that she had been called to the service of God, she was inspired by Pastor Marc Boegner of Passy-Annonciation to study theology. As a result, she went to the University of Geneva, where she graduated with distinction in 1934. She had hoped to become a pastor but there were no arrangements for women to do so. Instead, André-Numa Bertrand, head of the Union of Reformed Churches arranged for her to go to Sainte-Croix-Vallée-Française in the south of France where she worked as a parochial assistant, organizing courses and contributing to the activities of the local YWCA.

In early 1941, Schmidt was invited to help to care for refugees at the Gurs internment camp but after working there for six months, she contracted typhoid and had to leave. The following year, she was assigned to the parish of Sète. In 1949, at the invitation of the parishioners, she was ordained on 20 October by the regional president in a service conducted by Pastor Westphal. She continued to serve the parish until 1958 when she requested a transfer to Algeria. Encouraged by André Chatoney, head of the church's Algeria Region, she had chosen Algeria not only to help with suffering and confusion there but because there was a real need for a pastor in Blida-Médéa. When she arrived, she did her utmost to build bridges between the local Muslims and the French colonialists, although she felt she was living in a European ghetto. In particular, she arranged courses in reading, sewing and child care for young Muslim women. But she was equally concerned at the plight of the French women in the area who were experiencing a growing feeling of insecurity.

In the end, as the number of her parishioners continued to decrease after the Évian Accords in 1962, she finally returned to France in 1963, after receiving an invitation to take up an appointment at the parish in Nancy. She enjoyed the atmosphere of the university town, taking up once again the cause for women's ordination. She took part in the national synod as a delegate representing the east of France. After lengthy discussions, it was finally decided that women should be admitted as ministers of the church on the same basis as men.

Élisabeth Schmidt remained in Nancy until her retirement in 1972 when she joined her sister in Castres where she died on 14 March 1986.
