= Elisabeth Djurle =

Swedish Lutheran dean

Orders
- Ordination: 10 April 1960 by Helge Ljungberg

Personal details
- Born: 10 October 1930
- Died: 11 February 2014 (aged 83)
- Denomination: Lutheranism

Elisabeth Marianne Djurle Olander (10 October 1930 – 11 February 2014) was a Swedish Lutheran priest, later a dean. On Palm Sunday, 10 April 1960, she became one of the first three female priests in Sweden when she was ordained by Bishop Helge Ljungberg in Stockholm Cathedral. The same day Margit Sahlin was ordained in Österskär and Ingrid Persson in Härnösand Cathedral.

== Biography ==
Born in Jönköping on 10 October 1930, Elisabeth Marianne Djurle was the daughter of the agronomist Otto Djurle and Olga Svensson. While at high school, she joined the Växjö branch of the KGF, a Christian association, which encouraged her to preach at church services during the early 1950s. In 1957, after graduating in theology from Lund University, she received training to prepare her for the priesthood.

Following her ordination in 1960, Djurle served in the parishes of Nacka, Spånga and Vällingby becoming a parish priest. When she retired in 1995, she was given the title of "prost honoris causa" or honorary dean.

In 1968, Djurle married the engineer Nils-Gustav Olander with who she had three children. She died on 11 February 2014 in Stockholm and is buried in Norra begravningsplatsen.
