= Elise Pfister =

Swiss theologian and cleric (1886–1944)

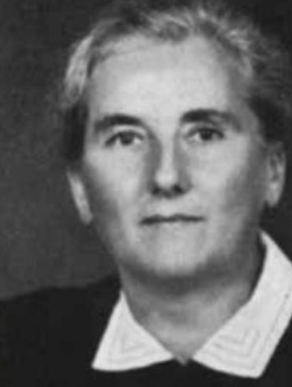
Elise Pfister

Elise Pfister (1886–1944) was a Swiss theologian and cleric. In 1918, together with Rosa Gutknecht, she was one of the first two women to graduate in theology. The same year, both were ordained as pastors of the Reformed Church of Zürich. They are considered to be the first women in Europe to be ordained as pastors.

Born on 22 September 1886 in Horgen, Elise Pfister was the daughter of Hans Jacob Pfister and Albertine Sigg. After qualifying as a teacher in 1906, she taught at primary schools in Albis and Dübendorf. She then studied theology at the University of Zurich, graduating in 1918. Together with her friend Rosa Gutknecht, she was ordained the same year. Appointed as assistant pastors at Zurich's Grossmünster, the two were principally involved in social work. Although the church and their male colleagues would have liked them to become vicars of their own parishes, as they did not have the right to vote, in 1920 the governmental authorities concluded that women could not be assigned to publicly funded administrative positions such as pastors in charge of their own parishes. They therefore remained as assistants for the remainder of their careers.

Elise Pfister died in Zürich on 6 February 1944.
