= Sarah E. Dickson =

American Presbyterian elder (1880–1965)

Sarah Ellen Dickson
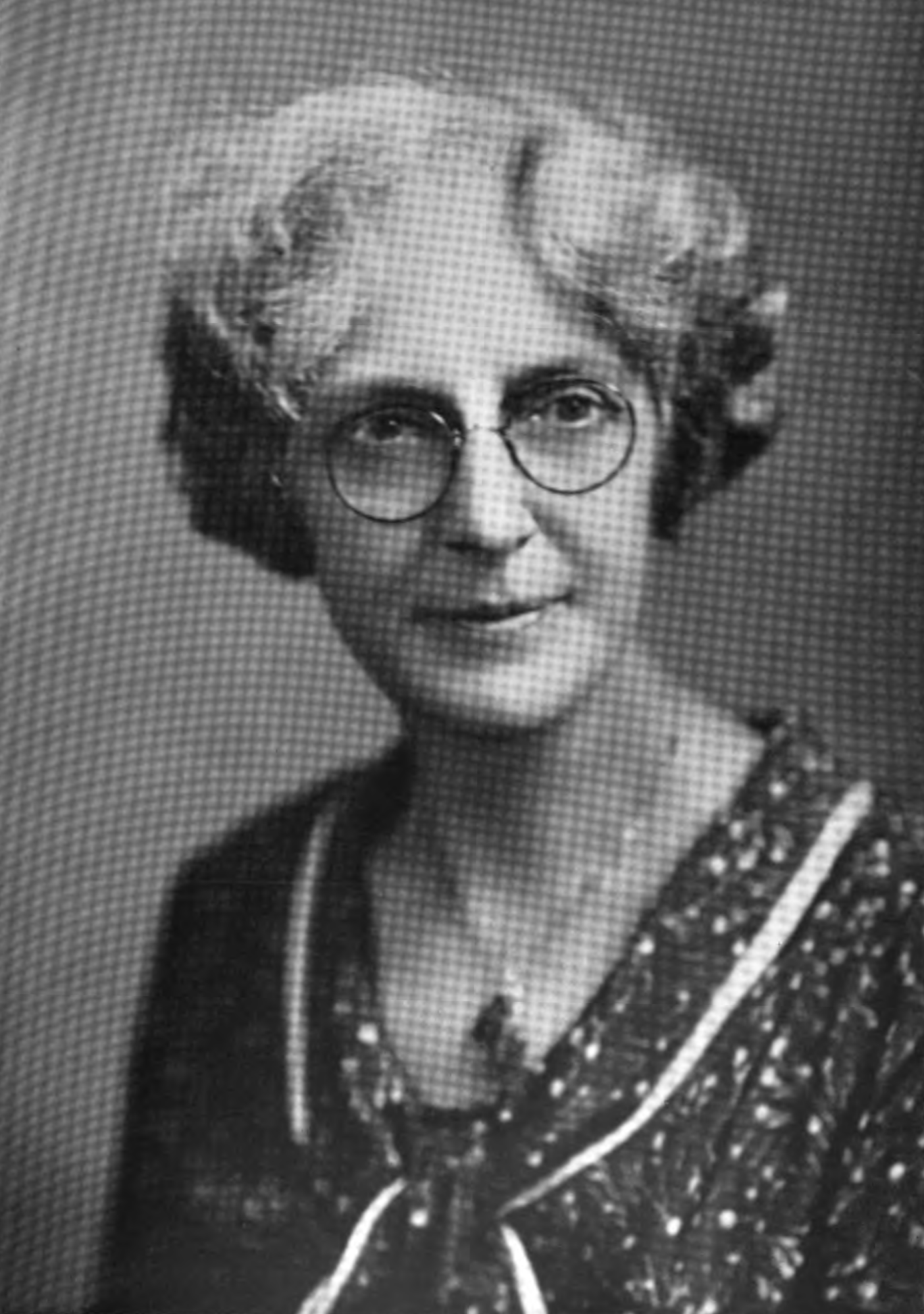
- Born: August 31, 1880; Elwood, Illinois
- Died: November 21, 1965 (aged 85); New York City
- Occupation: Presbyterian church elder
- Years active: 1904-1965

Sarah Ellen Dickson (August 31, 1880 – November 21, 1965) was the first woman elder in the Presbyterian Church in 1930. She was a "pioneer in the daily vacation bible school movement," She was active in church work for over 60 years and was known as "the chief".

== Biography ==
She was born in 1880 in Elwood, Illinois, a small suburb of Chicago. She was the daughter of John Richard Dickson and Grace Ellwood Dickson, her father was a merchant. Her parents both died while she was a child, and she was taken in by her grandparents at age fifteen. She was educated in the Chicago Public Schools.

She became active in church work. She was appointed secretary of Second Presbyterian Church in 1904, and organized and was first president of the Young Women's Presbyterian Union.

In 1906 she became secretary, treasurer and editor of the Federated Religious Press. In 1911 and 1912, as executive secretary of the Layman's Evangelistic Council she directed evangelistic campaigns across the country including for Billy Sunday, John Wilbur Chapman, and others.

In the early 1920s, Dickson took under her wing a "motherless boy" named Richard E. Evans, and effectively (but not legally) became his foster mother. She guided his religious education and encouraged him to become a minister.

In 1924 she moved to Edgewater Presbyterian Church and in 1925 was appointed one of the first deaconesses in Chicago, at that time the highest position a woman could hold in the church.

In the fall of 1927, while still a seminary student, Evans preached at the newly established Presbyterian church in Wauwatosa, Wisconsin and made a strong impression. After just a few Sundays preaching, the congregation asked Evans to be their pastor. Dickson moved to Wauwatosa as well and became director of religious education at the church.

Presbyterians had considered, but rejected, women as elders in 1920 and again in 1929. At the 1930 General Assembly in Cincinnati, the idea was approved by a vote of 158-118 on May 31, 1930. Pastor Richard Evans was present as an observer, and telephoned home to set up a congregational meeting upon his return. At that meeting on June 2, 1930, Dickson was unanimously elected an elder of the Wauwatosa church. One member remarked that this happened because "she deserved it."

Evans left Wauwatosa in 1933, and Dickson moved with him to another church. The pair moved to Florida in 1937 to work with a publishing company.

Dickson was active in her career in promoting interfaith activities. During the 1950s she travelled to the Holy Land four times, each time in a wheelchair.

Dickson moved to New York City in 1960 and was an elder at the Church of the Crossroads on 14th Street. She died at St. Barnabas Hospital on November 21, 1965.

A Presbyterian retirement home in Menomonee Falls, Wisconsin is named Dickson Hollow in honor of Sarah Dickson.

== See also ==
- Margaret Towner
