= Ingrid Persson =

Swedish Lutheran priest

- Church: Church of Sweden

Orders
- Ordination: 10 April 1960 by Ruben Josefson

Personal details
- Born: 29 May 1912 Slöta Församling, Falköping Municipality
- Died: 22 October 2000 (aged 88) Härnösand
- Education: Uppsala University

Ingrid Hanna Margareta Persson (1912–2000) was a Swedish priest. On Palm Sunday, 10 April 1960, she became one of the first three female priests in Sweden when she was ordained by Bishop Ruben Josefson in Härnösand Cathedral. The same day Margit Sahlin and Elisabeth Djurle were ordained in Stockholm.

== Biography ==
Born on 29 May 1912 in Slöta Församling, Falköping Municipality, Ingrid Persson was the daughter of the estate owner John Persson and Hildegard Andersson. After matriculating from high school in Gothenburg in 1930, she passed a preparatory examination in theology and went on to study at Uppsala University where she graduated as Cand.theol. in 1936.

On graduating, Persson took up employment in various occupations including teacher and later scouting secretary for the YWCA in Stockholm. In 1939, she served as youth secretary in the Diocese of Härnösand, coordinating 129 associations. She began to assist at church services, sometimes holding sermons long before women were admitted as priests. In the mid-1940s, she taught at the Ersta Diaconia Centre in Stockholm, later becoming head of studies at the Samaritans Home in Uppsala.

For some time, despite opposition from other bishops, Torsten Bohlin, bishop of Härnösand, had supported Persson's wish to become a priest. In 1958, the Church of Sweden agreed that women should be allowed to serve as priests. The following year, Gunnar Hultgren, the archbishop of Uppsala, asked her if she was interested in becoming one of the first female priests. After accepting his invitation, in 1959 she underwent training for the priesthood in Lund.

On 21 January 1960, a meeting of bishops decided that three women should be ordained as priests: in addition Persson, Elisabeth Djurle Olander and Margit Sahlin. The ordination of all three took place on Easter Sunday, 10 April 1960. Persson continued to support the ordination of women as priests and helped many to accomplish their goals and to perform their duties.

In 1979, Ingrid Persson married the minister Sven Söderlind. They had no children together. She died in Härnösand on 22 October 2000.
