= Mary Matz =

American theologian (1931–2013)

- Born: Mary Jane Dill; August 10, 1931; Havertown, Pennsylvania
- Died: July 31, 2013 (aged 81); Bethlehem, Pennsylvania
- Occupations: Minister, theologian
- Years active: 1953-1995
- Known for: first woman to be ordained in the Moravian Church in North America
- Spouse: William W. Matz (m. January 8, 1955)

Mary Matz (August 10, 1931 – July 31, 2013) was an American theologian who became the first woman ordained by the Moravian Church in North America. She was also a vice president of the Moravian National Council of Churches.

== Biography ==
Mary Jane Dill was born on August 10, 1931, in Havertown, Pennsylvania to Olive (née Wise) and Charles Dill. Dill was raised in the Lutheran church and after completing her basic schooling in Havertown, she attained a bachelor's degree from Grove City College in Pennsylvania in 1953. Upon completion of her degree, Dill moved to Athens, Ohio, where she became the Director of Christian Education of the First Presbyterian Church. Two years later, on January 8, 1955, she married William W. Matz who was a Moravian pastor.

=== Career ===
The couple began their first pastorate by founding the Hilltop Community Moravian Church close to Utica, New York. Throughout the next sixteen years, they served together in four congregations in the Palmyra Moravian Church at Cinnaminson, New Jersey, Sharon Moravian Church of Tuscarawas, Ohio, Lititz Moravian Church in Lititz, Pennsylvania and Edgeboro Moravian Church at Bethlehem, Pennsylvania. When William was offered the opportunity to become Vice President of Moravian College and Dean of the Moravian Theological Seminary, Matz took the opportunity to attend Seminary training. She was ordained as a minister, the first ordained woman in the Moravian Church in America, on February 16, 1975, and graduated 3 months later with her Master of Divinity degree. Matz then served for three years as an assistant pastor in the Central Moravian Church. In 1977, she was appointed as Director of Educational Ministries for the Northern Province of the Moravian Church, a position she held until 1995.

Matz earned her doctorate in Ministry from Drew University in Madison, New Jersey in 1982. That same year she published Ministry together: A manual for shared ministry training, a book about pastors and laity working together. To further that goal, she co-founded the Lehigh Valley Lay Academy, a series of spiritual developmental classes for the ministry and laymen. She published a second book in 1990 entitled Choices and values in a rapidly changing world, which focused on Bible study choices for the modern world. Matz held the position of interim pastor with the Lancaster Moravian Church and in the 1990s, shared the interim pastorate in Bethlehem of East Hills Moravian Church with her husband. She was a vice president of the Moravian National Council of Churches and in 1995 was honored with the John Hus Award for outstanding alumni from the Moravian Theological Seminary.

Matz died on July 31, 2013, at the Moravian Village, of Bethlehem, Pennsylvania.

== Works ==
- Matz, Mary D. (1982a). Introducing and testing the concept and practice of shared ministry in the East Hills Moravian Church (D.D.). Drew University.
- Matz, Mary D. (1982b). Ministry together: A manual for shared ministry training. Bethlehem, Pennsylvania: Moravian Church. OCLC 17833701.
- Matz, Mary D. (1990). Choices and values in a rapidly changing world. Winston-Salem, N.C: Interprovincial Woman's Board of the Moravian Church. OCLC 859162499.
