= Rachel Henderlite =

American pastor

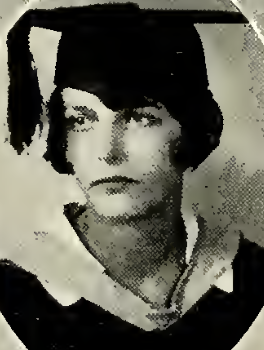
- Rachel Henderlite, from the 1927 yearbook of Agnes Scott College

Personal life
- Born: Rachel Henderlite; December 30, 1905 Henderson, North Carolina
- Died: November 6, 1991 (aged 85) Austin, Texas
- Parent(s): James Henry Henderlite; Nelle Crow Henderlite
- Education: Agnes Scott College, Biblical Seminary

Religious life
- Religion: Christianity
- Denomination: Presbyterian
- Ordination: 1965

Rachel Henderlite (December 30, 1905 – November 6, 1991) was an American religious leader who was the first woman to be ordained a pastor of the Presbyterian Church in the United States (PCUS), which later merged with the United Presbyterian Church in the United States of America (1983) to become the Presbyterian Church U.S.A. She held professorships at several American colleges and seminaries, wrote six books, and was active in various ecumenical efforts.

== Early years and education ==
Rachel Henderlite was born in Henderson, North Carolina, on December 30, 1905, one of three children of James Henry Henderlite and Nelle (Crow) Henderlite. Her father was a Presbyterian pastor who advocated for a reunification of the southern and northern branches of the American church; Henderlite spent much time with him, and her religious views were shaped by his influence. She attended high school in Gastonia, North Carolina, and went on to study at Mary Baldwin College in Virginia for two years. She earned her B.A. in English from Agnes Scott College in Georgia (1928) after taking some time off due to tuberculosis. For a time after college, she taught high school English.

In 1931, Henderlite moved to New York at attend the Biblical Seminary, graduating with an M.A. in Christian education (1936).

== Academic career ==
Henderlite took a post as dean and professor of Bible studies at Mississippi Synodical College, staying until 1938, when she moved on to a similar professorship at Montreat College in North Carolina. After three years, she left Montreat College to care for her father, who was in failing health. During this period she returned to teaching at local high schools. After her father's death in 1942, Henderlite enrolled at Yale University Divinity School to study Christian ethics under H. Richard Niebuhr. Yale would later (1947) award her a Ph.D. in Christian ethics.

In 1944, she accepted a professorship in applied Christianity and Christian nurture at the General Assembly's School for Lay Workers (ATS, later known as the Presbyterian School of Christian Education and today as the Union Presbyterian Seminary) in Richmond, Virginia. At the time, ATS was primarily a graduate school, and it taught many women who were training for positions (such as missionary work) that did not require ordination, as the American Presbyterian churches did not ordain women at that time. In addition to teaching standard courses on the Bible and Christian education, she inaugurated a series of courses on her specialty, Christian ethics.

In 1966, she accepted a professorship in Christian education at Austin Presbyterian Theological Seminary in Texas. She retired from full-time teaching six years later.

== Other activities ==
Henderlite served on the PCUS's Board of Education (1957–59) in various capacities, including as a director of educational research and director of curriculum development. In these positions, she is credited with leading the development of what became known as "The Covenant Life Curriculum," the church's first curriculum to "deal seriously with social ethics from a Christian perspective". She also served as the only North American representative to a series of meetings sponsored by the World Alliance of Reformed Churches in the 1950s to advise on marriage theology and interfaith marriage.

Between 1966 and 1981, she was active in the Consultation on Church Union, a joint conference of 10 North American Christian denominations. In 1977, she became the first woman to serve as the group's president, a position she held for five years.

== Ordination ==
In 1965, Henderlite was ordained by the PCUS, making her the first woman to become a minister in this branch of the American Presbyterian Church. (Nine years earlier, the church's northern branch, the Presbyterian Church in the United States, had ordained its first female minister, Margaret Towner.) Henderlite was ordained at All Souls Presbyterian Church in Richmond, a predominantly black congregation that she had helped to found.

While her ordination was commended by many of her co-religionists, a certain retired pastor in South Carolina sent her a postcard each year until his death, stating that the ordination of women "is a grievous sin because it says in the Bible, 'Let the women keep silent in the churches'".

== Recognition and honors ==
Henderlite was honored with the Union Medal from Union Theological Seminary in 1983. In 1990, the Presbyterian School of Christian Education established a scholarship in her name.

== Personal ==
She died of a heart attack on November 6, 1991, in Austin, Texas.

Her papers are held by the Presbyterian Historical Society in Philadelphia, Pennsylvania.

== Books ==
- Exploring the Old Testament (1945)
- Exploring the New Testament (1946)
- A Call to Faith (1955)
- Paul, Christian and World Traveler (1957)
- Forgiveness and Hope (1961)
- The Holy Spirit in Christian Education (1964)
