= Margit Sahlin =

Swedish Lutheran priest

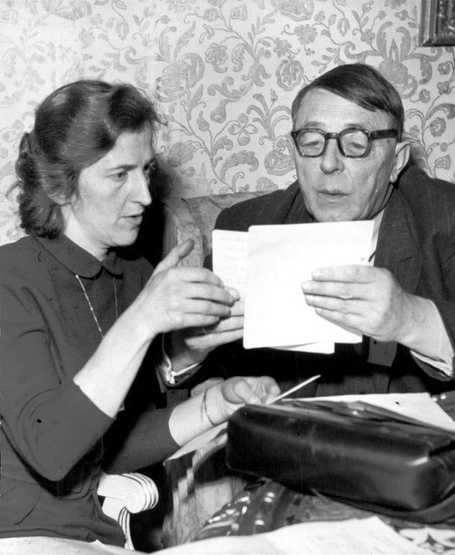
- Born: 6 May 1914; Johannes parish
- Died: 1 March 2003; Hedvig Eleonora and Oscar Parish
- Resting place: Uppsala Old Cemetery
- Occupation: Protestant theologian
- Relatives: Anna Bohlin, Ingvar Vilhelm Sahlin

Margit Rigmor Sahlin (1914–2003) was a pioneering Swedish Lutheran priest. On Palm Sunday, 10 April 1960, she became one of the first three female priests in Sweden when she was ordained by Archbishop Gunnar Hultgren in the Saint Catherine Foundation chapel at Österskär near Stockholm. The same day Ingrid Persson was ordained in Härnösand Cathedral and Elisabeth Djurle in Stockholm.

== Biography ==
Born on 6 May 1914 in Stockholm, Margit Rigmor Sahlin was the 12th and youngest child of the schoolteacher Enar Sahlin and Ragnhild Nettelbladet. She was the granddaughter of Carl Yngve Sahlin who was the rector of Uppsala University from 1876 to 1889.

After matriculating from the Wallinska skolan in Stockholm when only 17, she studied at Uppsala University where she graduated in romance languages, earning a doctorate in 1940. Thereafter she read theology, graduating in 1943. While still at university, she attracted considerable attention when she published an article in the Christian journal Vår Lösen calling for the ordination of women.

When the Second World War ended in 1945, Sahlin travelled widely in Europe. She was inspired by the religious communities she visited in Taize, France, Iona, Scotland, and Assisi in Italy. She hoped to join the church but at the time women were not admitted as priests in Sweden. In 1948, she became active in the Women's Church Council which led to the founding of Saint Catherine's Foundation (S:ta Katharinastiftelsen). She was the principal contributor to the foundation which began her life's work.

Despite strong opposition, in 1958 the Church of Sweden resolved to permit women to be ordained as priests. Sahlin became one of the three women to request ordination. On Easter Sunday in 1960, she was ordained in the Saint Catherine Chapel by Archbishop Hultgren. In 1970, she became the rector of Engelbrekts församling in the diocese of Stockholm, so becoming Sweden's first female rector.

Margit Sahlin retired in 1979 but remained active in the Saint Catherine Foundation until her death in Stockholm on 1 March 2003. She is buried in Uppsala Old Cemetery.

== Selected publications ==
In addition to contributing to journals, Sahlin wrote several books, including:

- 1950: Sahlin, Margit, Man och kvinna i Kristi kyrka, Diakonistyrelses Bokförlag
- 1959: Sahlin, Margit, Ordets tjänst i en förändrad värld, Svenska Kyrkans Diakonistyrelses Bokförlag
- 1980: Sahlin, Margit, Dags för omprövning, Proprius
- 2000: Sahlin, Margit; Åhlstedt, Madeleine, S:ta Katharinastiftelsen ett 50 årigt trosäventyr, Stockholm
