= Annalu Waller =

Scottish computer scientist

The Reverend Annalu Waller OBE

Academic work
- Discipline: Computer Science
- Sub-discipline: Assistive technology
- Institutions: University of Dundee

Annalu Waller OBE is Professor of Computer Science at the University of Dundee and leads the Augmentative and Alternate Communication (AAC) Research Group at the university.

== Career ==
Waller was appointed an OBE in the 2016 New Year Honours for services to people with Complex Communication Needs. In September 2017 she was awarded an honorary fellowship of the Royal College of Speech and Language Therapists for her work on AAC. She received the honour from the RCSLT's patron, the Countess of Wessex. She is a trustee of Capability Scotland.

Waller is an ordained priest and is the honorary Anglican Chaplain of the Dundee University Chaplaincy.
