= Margaret Towner =

American religious leader (born 1925)

Personal life
- Born: Margaret Ellen Towner; March 19, 1925 (age 101) Columbia, Missouri, U.S.
- Education: Carleton College, Syracuse University, Union Theological Seminary, Western Michigan University

Religious life
- Religion: Christianity
- Denomination: United Presbyterian Church in the United States of America
- Ordination: October 24, 1956

Margaret Ellen Towner (born March 19, 1925) is an American religious leader who was the first woman to be ordained a minister of the Presbyterian Church in the United States of America (PCUSA).

== Early life and education ==
Margaret Ellen Towner was born March 19, 1925, in Columbia, Missouri, to Milton Carsley Towner and Dorothy Marie (Schloeman) Towner. She majored in pre-medical studies at Carleton College, earning her B.A. in 1948. Afterwards, she worked as a medical photographer for the Mayo Clinic. She left the clinic and enrolled at Syracuse University in New York to study Christian audiovisual education; around the same time, she began volunteering at local churches in Syracuse (First Presbyterian Church) and East Genesee.

Even though the PCUSA was not yet ordaining women as ministers, the pastor at First Presbyterian Church suggested that Towner explore the ministry. The church offered her its Scattergood Fellowship to attend Union Theological Seminary in New York, where Towner undertook the three-year program leading to a Bachelor of Divinity degree, which she received in 1954. A decade later, in 1967, she earned an M.A. in guidance and counseling from Western Michigan University.

After obtaining her B.D., Towner was commissioned a church worker. She became director of Christian education at Takoma Park Presbyterian Church in Maryland (1954-1955) and then at First Presbyterian Church in Allentown, Pennsylvania (1955–58).

== Ordination and ministry ==
In 1955, the PCUSA voted to begin ordaining women as ministers. The following year, on Oct. 24, 1956, Towner became the first woman ordained to the ministry by PCUSA, with her ordination taking place at Syracuse-Cayuga Presbytery in New York. (Nine years later, the church's southern branch, the Presbyterian Church in the U.S. (PCUS) would ordain its first woman minister, Rachel Henderlite.) Since there were a number of Presbyterian women preparing for ordination in the wake of the PCUSA vote, Towner was initially not sure whether she was actually the first to be ordained. Her ordination was covered by Life photographer Alfred Eisenstaedt, and photographs of Towner's ordination ceremony appeared in a five-page spread in the November 12, 1956, issue of the magazine.

After being ordained, Towner returned to her congregation in Pennsylvania, though she was never asked to conduct services or preach in that church; and she was also made assistant pastor of First Presbyterian Church in Syracuse. Afterwards, she served at congregations in Kalamazoo, Michigan (First Church, 1958–69); Indianapolis, Indiana (Northminster Presbyterian Church, 1970–72); and Waukesha County, Wisconsin (Kettle Moraine parish, 1973-1990). At first she worked mainly in Christian education and as an assistant or associate pastor, only later becoming a full pastor. It was not until her very last posting that she was paid equally with male pastors. She spent 17 years in Waukesha County, where she was one of three co-pastors in a parish with six churches.

In 1981, the year that PCUSA celebrated the 25th anniversary of women's ordination in the church, Towner was elected vice-moderator of the church's General Assembly. Among her activities that year was a trip to Korea to talk to Presbyterian congregations, as the Korean churches were then considering whether to ordain women.

In 1990, at the end of her Milwaukee pastorate, she retired to Sarasota, Florida.

== Honors and legacy ==
In 1983, Towner was given the Distinguished Alumnus Award by Carleton College. In 1989, she was awarded an honorary doctorate of divinity by Carroll College. In 2006, the Milwaukee Presbytery established the Doctor Margaret E. Towner scholarship in her honor.

A number of women who followed Towner in the Presbyterian ministry have credited her as their role model and mentor.

In 2015, Towner celebrated her 90th birthday.

== See also ==
- Sarah E. Dickson
