= Rosa Gutknecht =

German-Swiss theologian and cleric

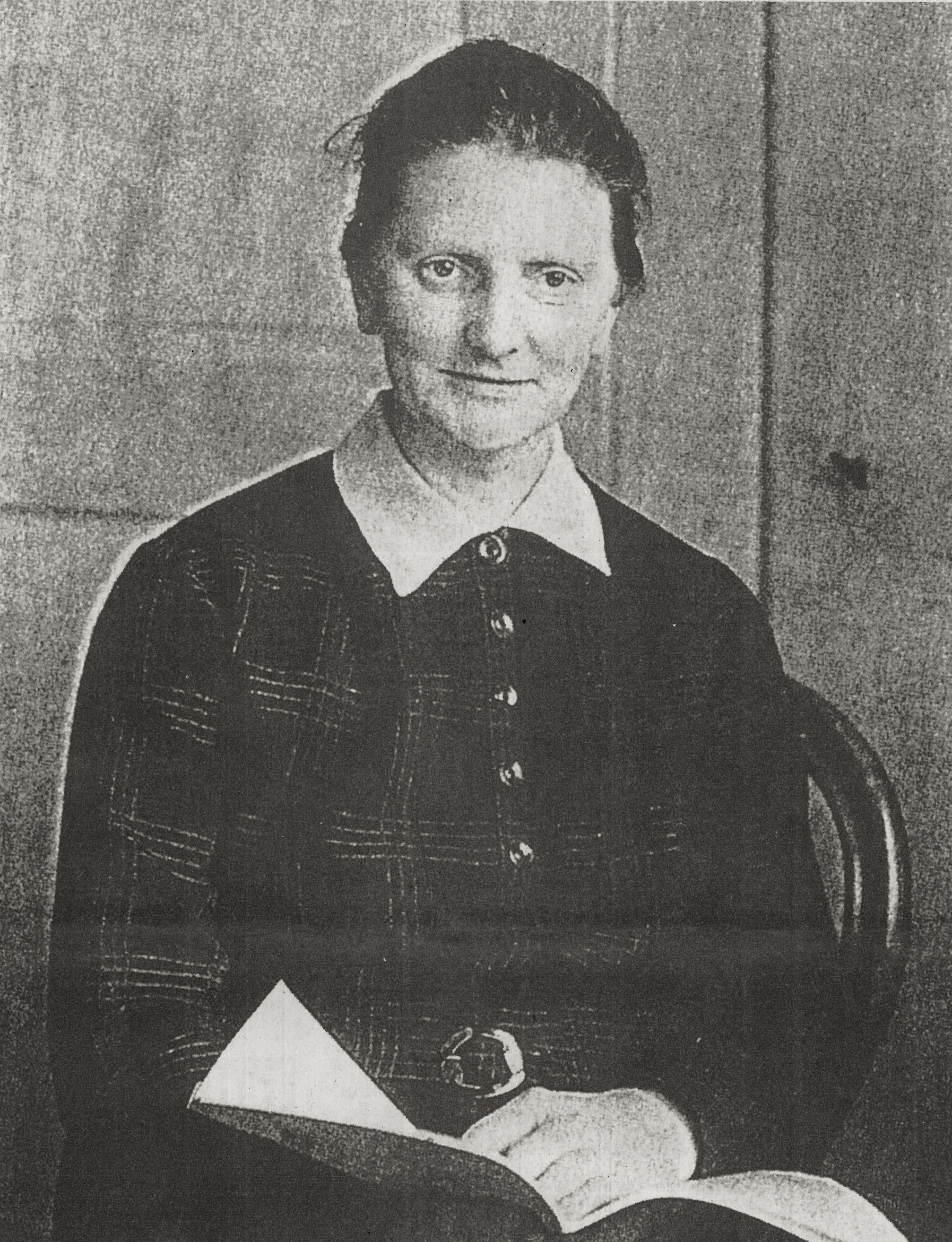
Rosa Gutknecht (c. 1920)

Laura Elisabeth Rosa Gutknecht (1885–1959) was a German-born Swiss theologian and cleric. In 1918, together with Elise Pfister, she was one of the first two women to graduate in theology. The same year, both were ordained as pastors of the Reformed Church of Zürich. They are considered to be the first women in Europe to be ordained as pastors.

== Biography ==
Born in Ludwigshafen, Germany, on 18 May 1885, Laura Elisabeth Rosa Gutknecht was brought up in Chur before she studied to become a teacher in Zürich. After working as a teacher for eight years, she studied theology at the University of Zurich, graduating in 1918. Together with her friend Elise Pfister, she was ordained the same year. Appointed as assistant pastors at Zurich's Grossmünster, the two were principally involved in social work. Although the church and their male colleagues would have liked them to become vicars of their own parishes, as they did not have the right to vote, in 1920 the governmental authorities concluded that women could not be assigned to publicly funded administrative positions such as pastors in charge of their own parishes. They therefore remained as assistants for the remainder of their careers. In 1939, Gutknecht founded and was the first president of the Swiss Association of Female Theologians.

Rosa Gutknecht retired from her Grossmünster position in 1953. She died in Zürich on 21 November 1959.

== Bibliography ==
- Irene Gysel, Andrea Spörri-Altherr, Alexia S. Zeller, «Rosa Gutknecht – Ehrung am Sechseläuten 2013», Neujahrsblatt der Gesellschaft zu Fraumünster, 2014.
