= Härnösand Cathedral =

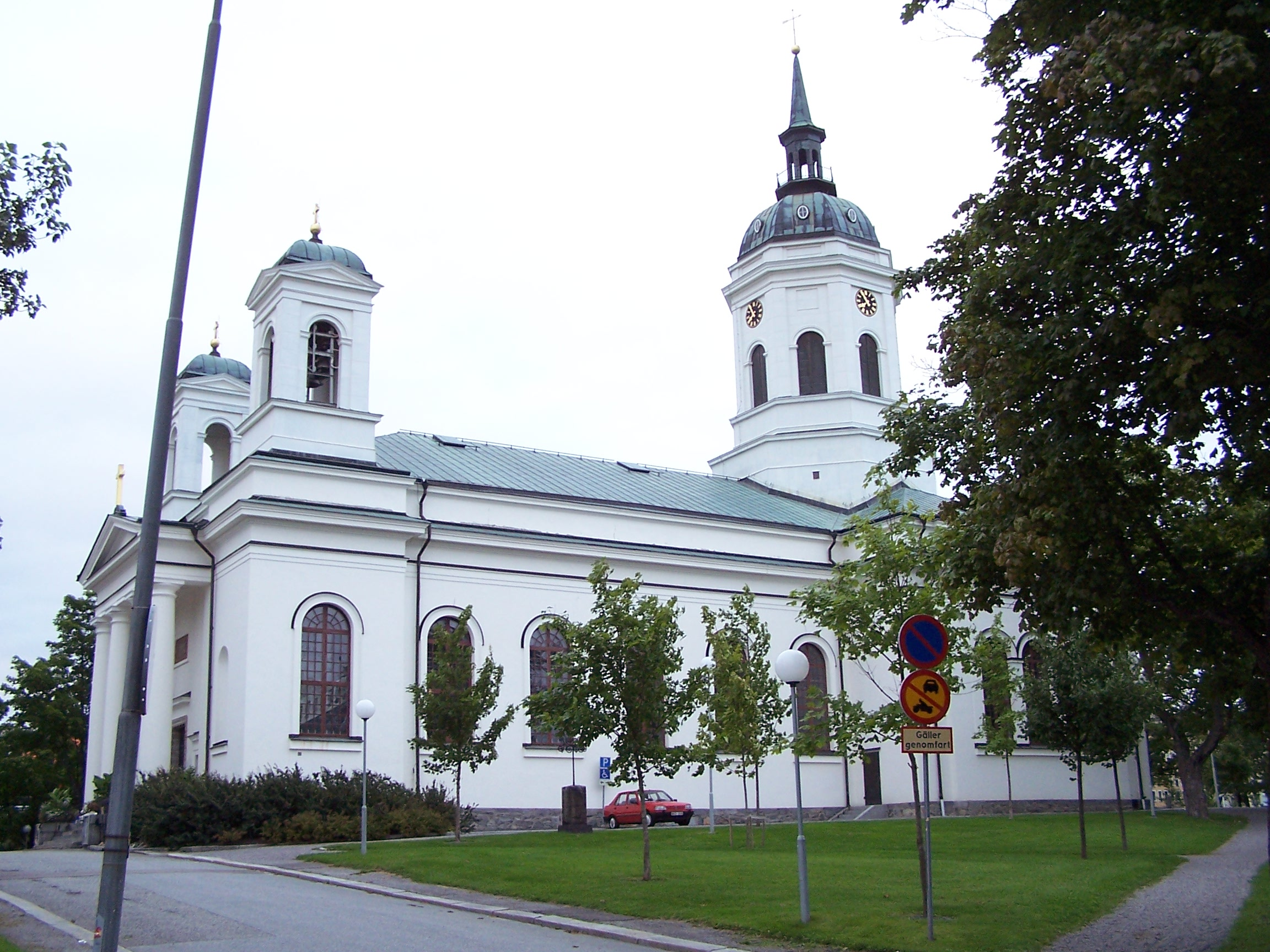
- Härnösand Cathedral in August 2005
- Härnösand Cathedral
- 62°37′52″N 17°56′30″E
- Location: Härnösand
- Country: Sweden
- Denomination: Church of Sweden

History
- Consecrated: 28 June 1846

Administration
- Diocese: Diocese of Härnösand

Clergy
- Bishop: Tuulikki Koivunen Bylund

Härnösand Cathedral (Swedish: Härnösands domkyrka) serves the Diocese of Härnösand of the Church of Sweden. It is located in Härnösand in Västernorrland County, Sweden. From atop the 46 metre-tall tower, the entire town of Härnösand can be viewed.

== History ==
Härnösand city's first church was built 1593. The four chandeliers are from the 17th century. In 1721 the church was burned down by Russian troops, and a new church was erected, and that church was eventually destroyed. The present church was inaugurated on 28 June 1846 and built according to plans by Johan Adolf Hawerman (1812-1885). The present church is located in the same location as the original and is Sweden's smallest cathedral.

The altar painting is by David von Coln (1689–1763). The baptismal font is a Spanish rococo work in silver and manufactured 1777. The organ was built in 1975 by the Danish firm of Bruno Christensen & Sønner Orgelbyggeri and has 57 stops. The organ facade is from the 1700s Cahman organ that was saved from the original church.

The cathedral contains a 37-bell carillon, built by the Bergholtz Bellfoundry in 1981.

== Gallery ==
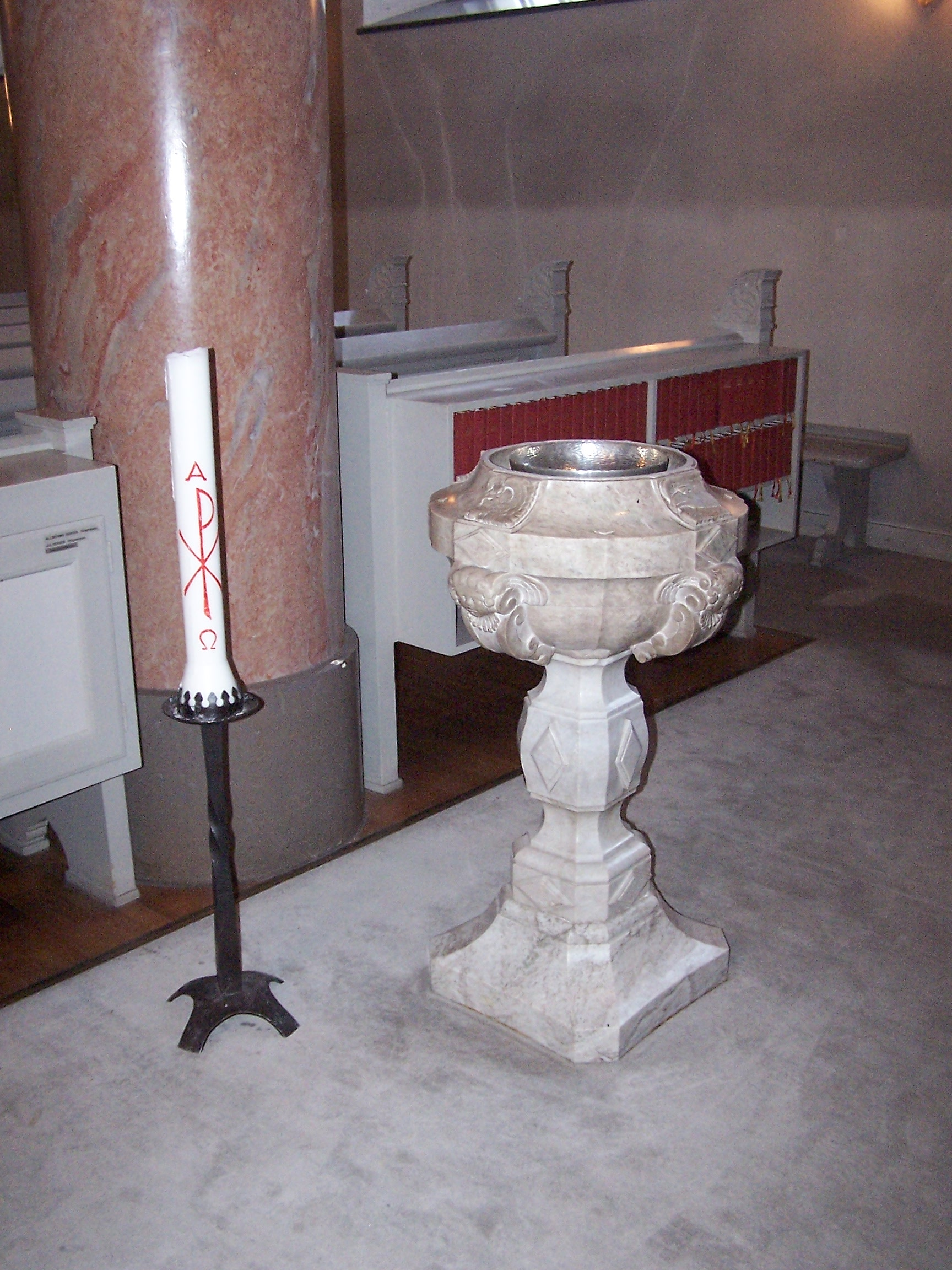
Baptismal font

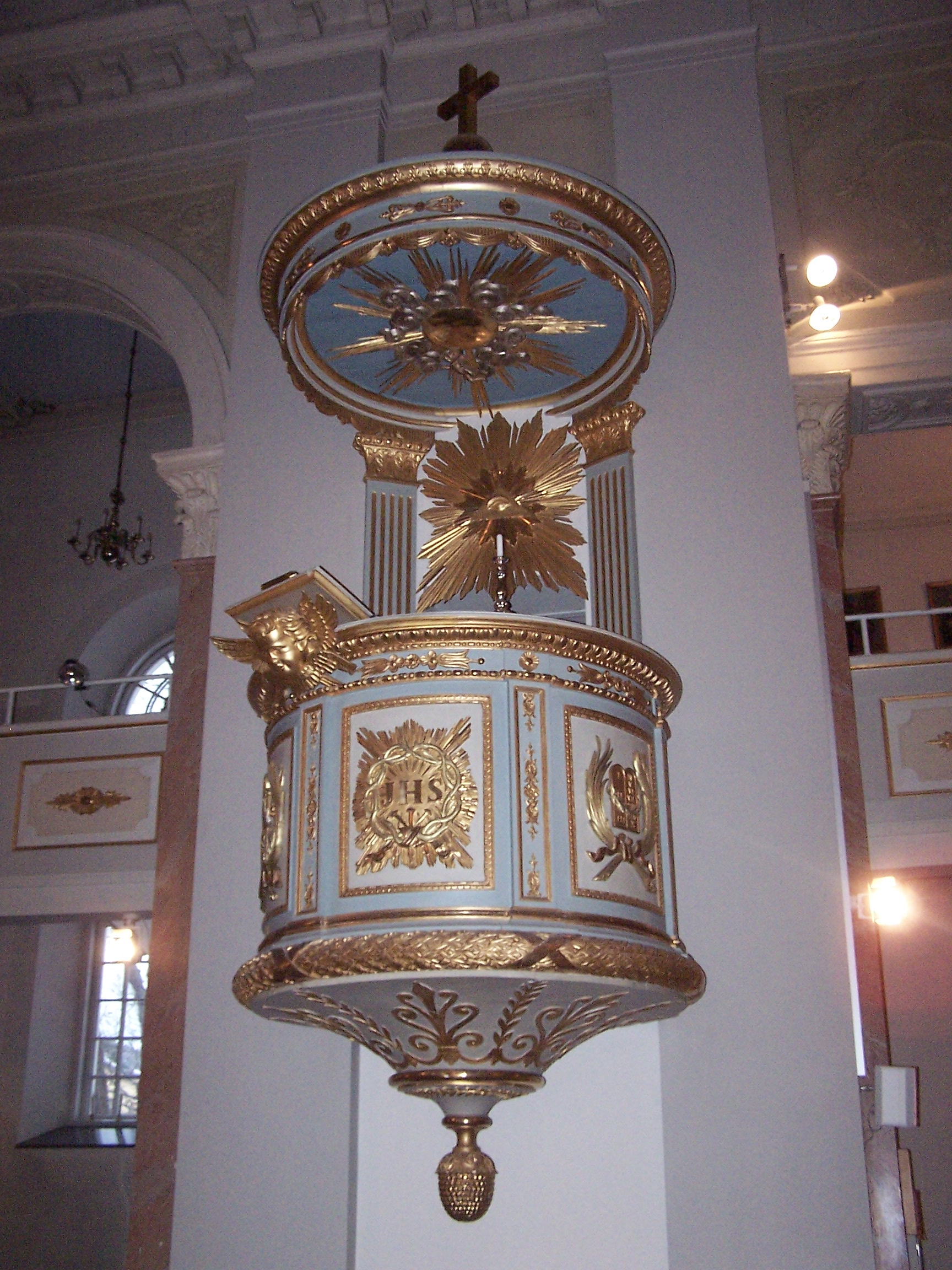
Pulpit

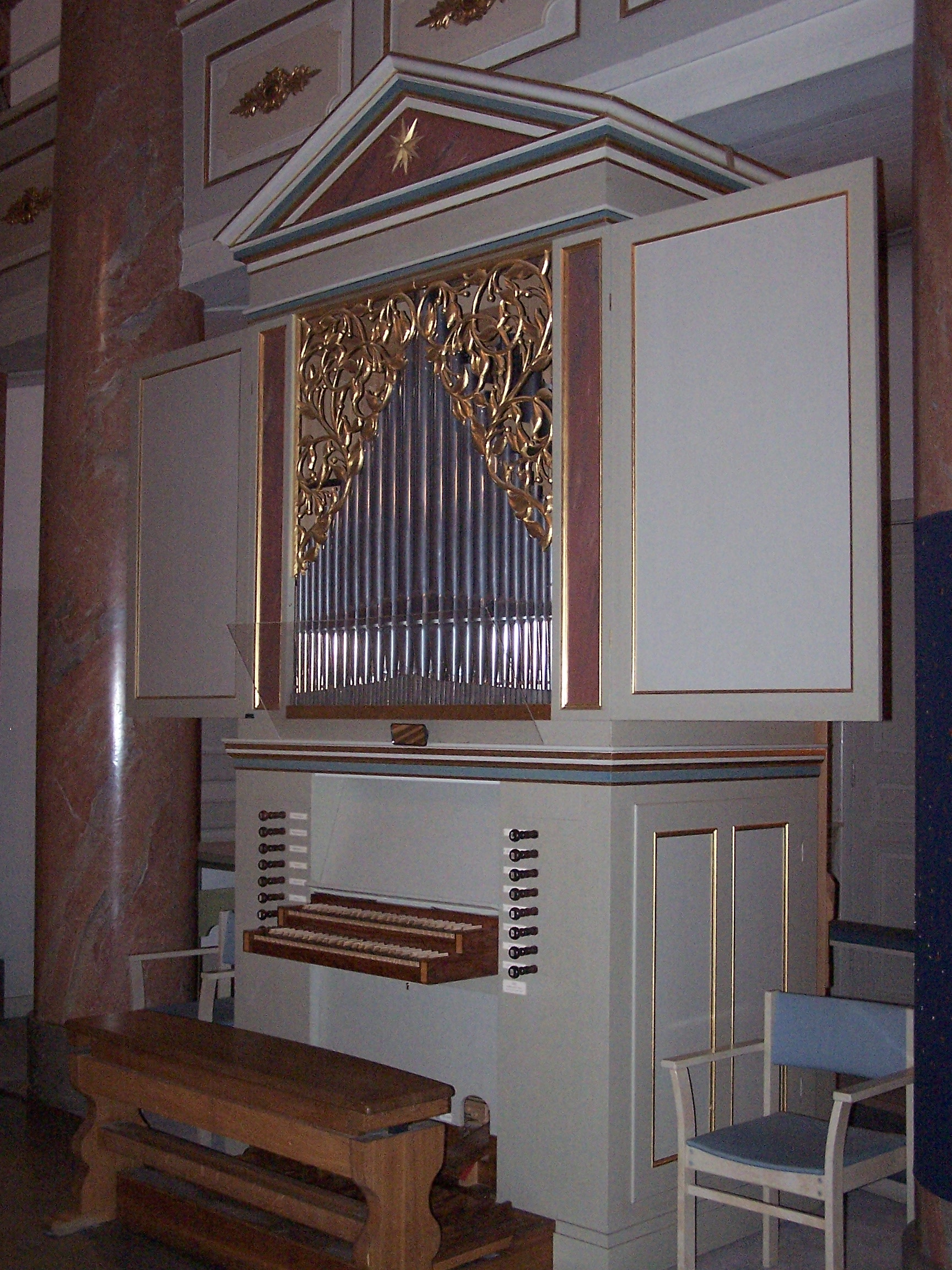
Choir organ

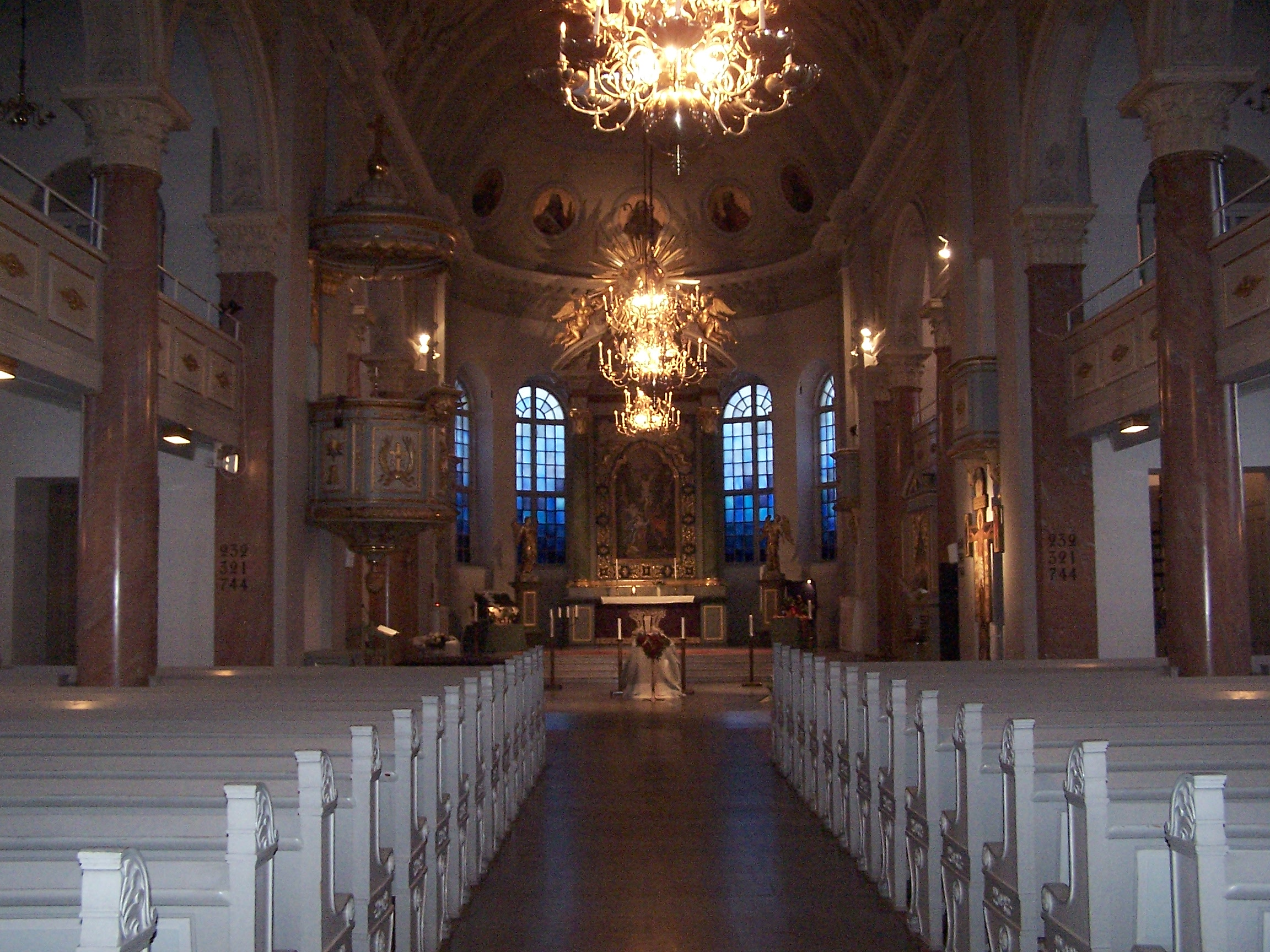
Interior

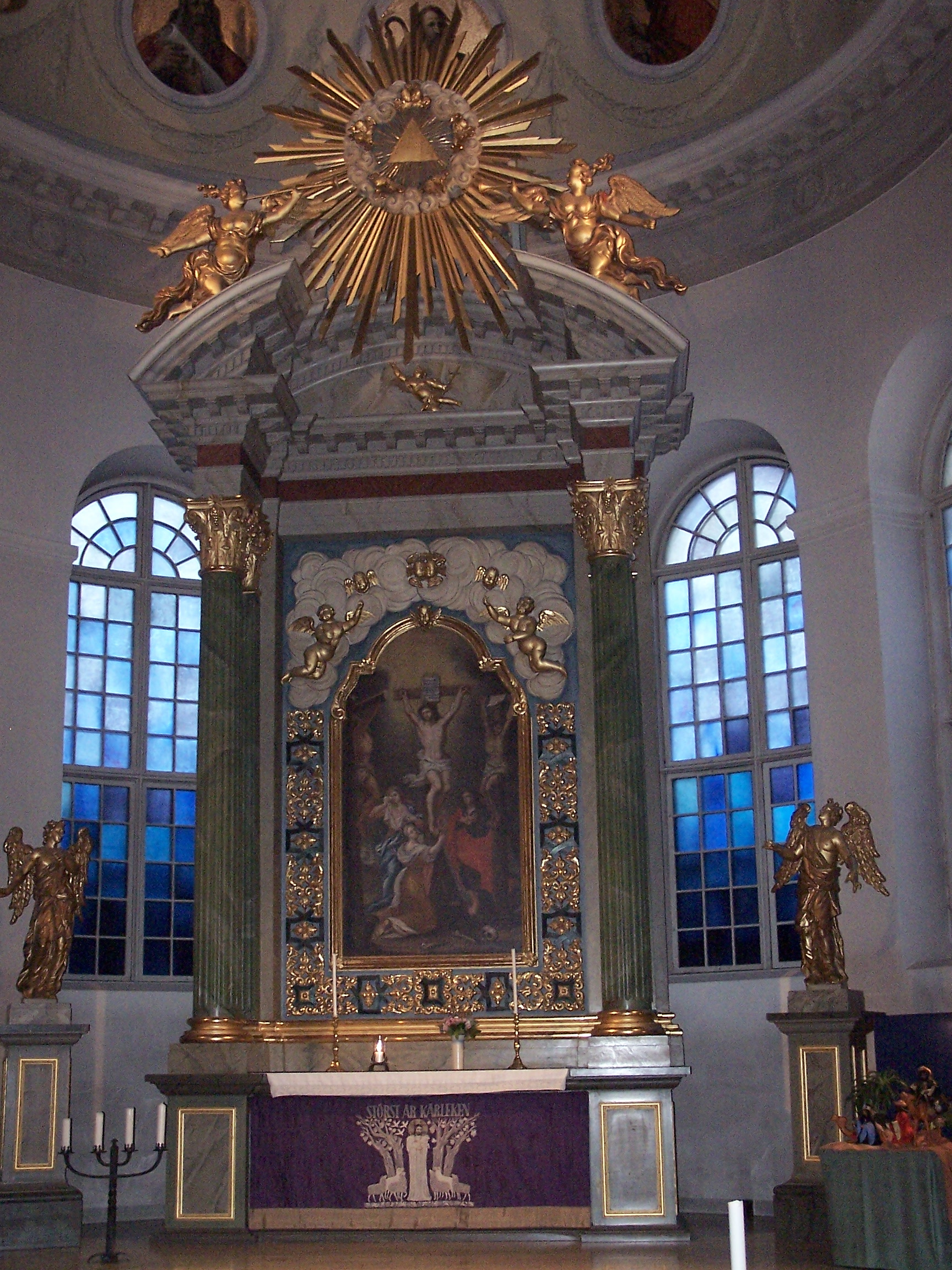
Sanctuary

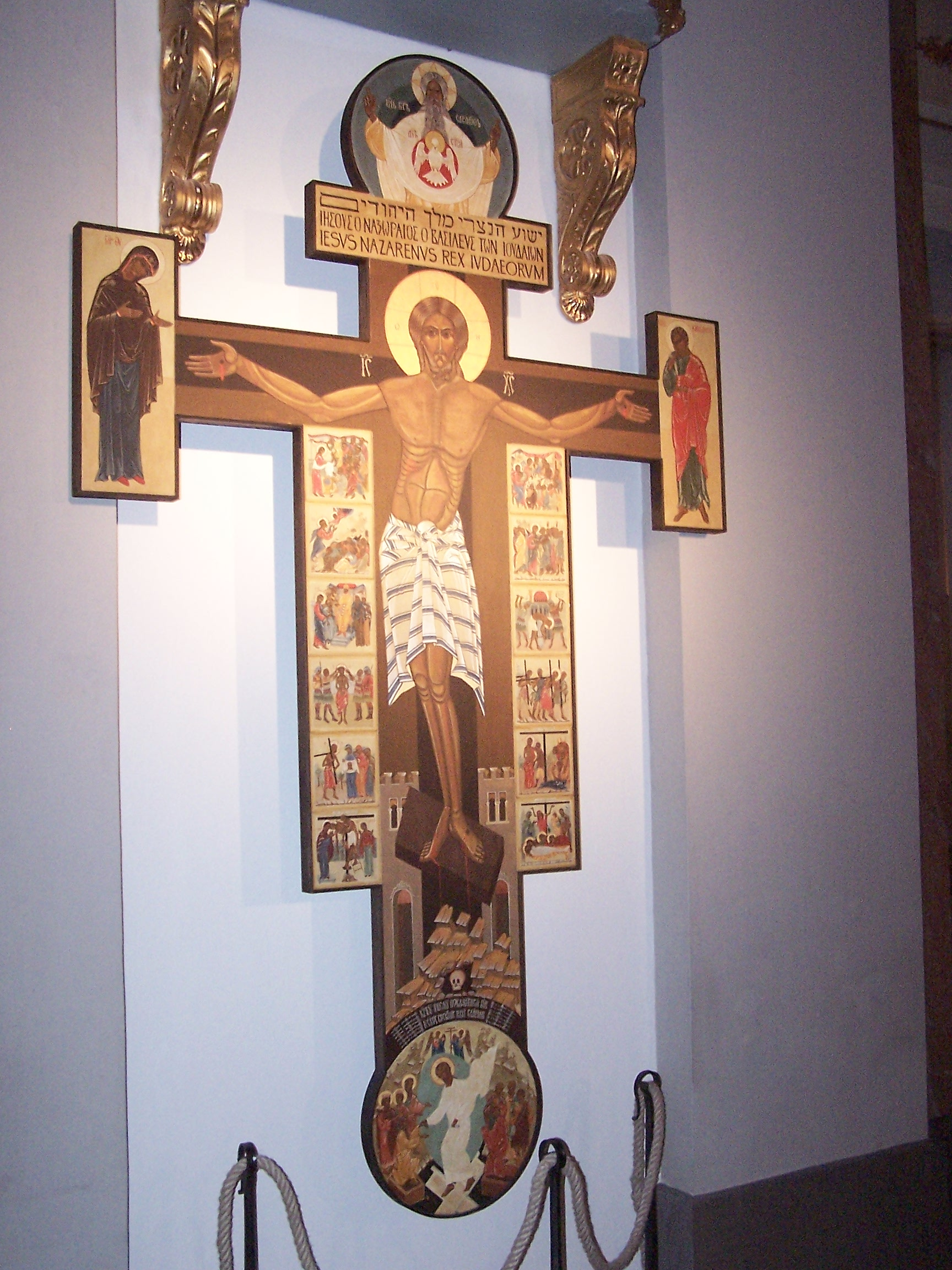
Crucifix
