= History of the Jews in Oldenburg =

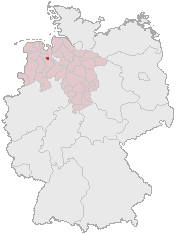
Oldenburg in 21st-century Germany.

The Jewish community of Oldenburg in northwest Germany was established as early as the 14th century. It has existed consecutively ever since, except for occasional deportations by the local rulers of the Duchy of Oldenburg and under the Holocaust, which annihilated the majority of Jews left in the city. Nevertheless, after the Holocaust, Jewish survivors returned and resettled in Oldenburg, in a community that now operates actively within the Central Council of Jews in Germany.

== History ==
=== 14th century ===
The first evidence of Jews in Oldenburg is a documentation of the words "Reuben, the son of R. Jeremiah - may his memory be blessed", on a bronze seal-ring, found in the immediate neighborhood of Oldenburg. In 1334, the city council stopped issuing protection decrees to the town's Jews, making them vulnerable to strangers and outsiders. Afterwards, Jews continued to live in Oldenburg under the protection of the duke, although he restricted their economic activities. In 1345, the Jews in Oldenburg were banned from any kind of trade except money lending. Though the Jews of the nearby village of Wildeshausen were expelled, there is no evidence of the expulsion of the Oldenburg community during that time.

=== 15th to 18th centuries ===
Between 1667 and 1773 Denmark ruled the Oldenburg area. During that time, Jews began settling in the city once again, in the encouragement of the Danes. A Jewish family by the name of Goldschmidt settled in town and worked in the selling and trading meat, though only the grandson (Joseph Baruch Goldschmidt) succeed in growing the business to be clearly profitable, earning him and his sons letters of protection in Oldenburg.

=== 19th century ===
In 1807, 27 Jews lived in Oldenburg, approximately 0.6% of the total 4,692 residents of Oldenburg at that time, and the size of the community grew steadily over the next decades, though it always stood at around 1% of the total population. By 1820 the community numbered 80 (1.2%), and 104 in 1855 (0.9%). The number continued to grow into 169 in 1875 (0.9%) until it reached 265 individuals in 1905.

During the 19th century several buildings and other services were established for the community, including a synagogue, and a school with a teacher, who was also the cantor and the schochet.

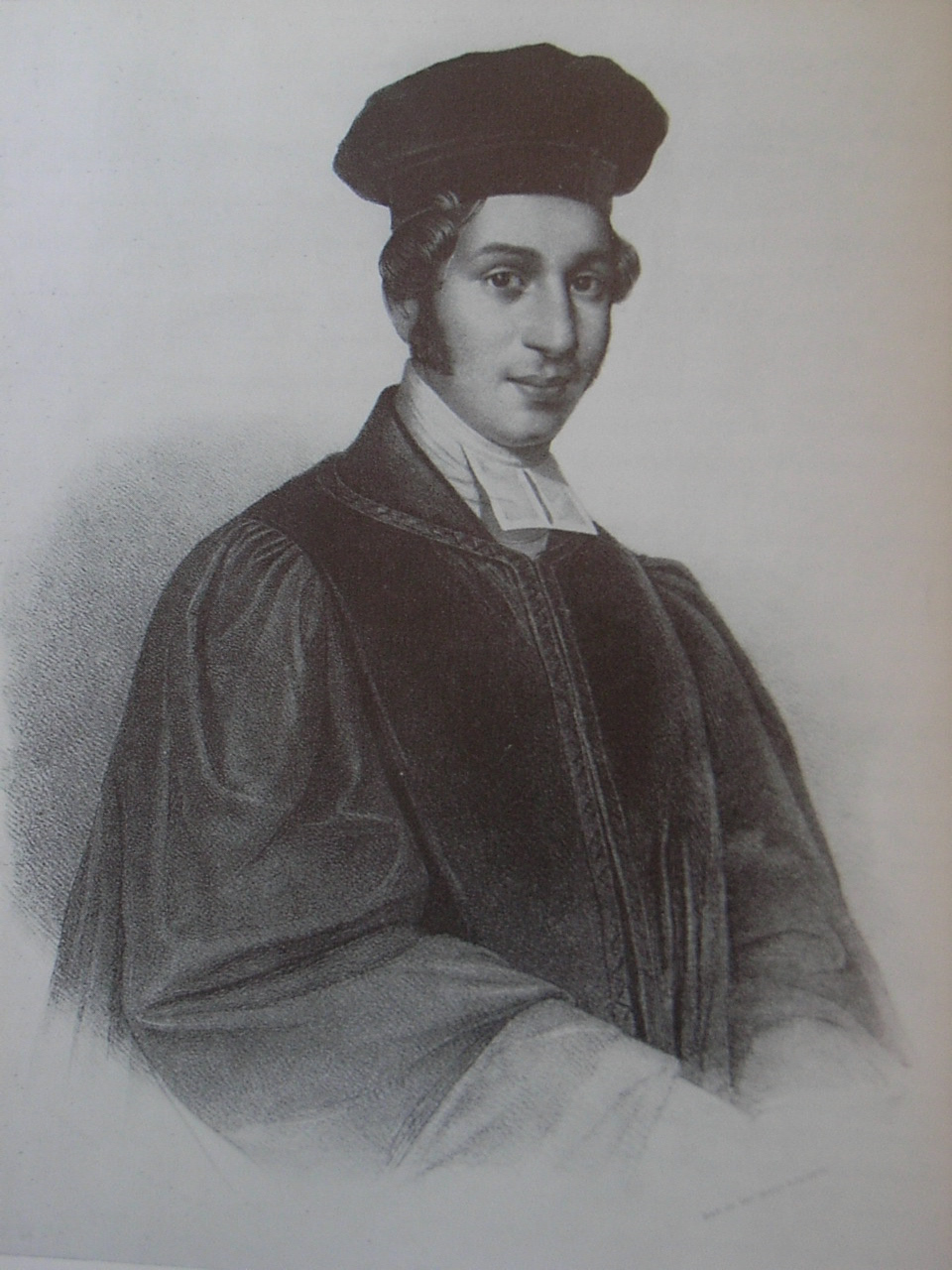
Young Nathan Marcus Adler (1803-1890), first Landrabbiner of Oldenburg

In 1808, the Duchy was the last part of the west-of-the-Rein Napoleon-conquered territories that insisted that Jews adopt fixed names. These names became popular among Jews in the region and were adopted by all Ashkenazi Jews and are now those ones most prevalent among Ashkenazi Jews worldwide. As part of the general Jewish emancipation process in Europe, Oldenburg, part of the North German Confederation emancipated the town's Jews in 1869. As a result, many Jews opened business in different professions. Some of them were successful, such as women's textile and leather stores H. Wall Heimer and L. Stein Thal, court banker Carl Ballin and his brother, pharmacist George Ballin; purveyors Hahlo and his brother Leopold Wilhelm, and Paul and Franz Reiersbach, who manufactured bicycles and musical instruments under the company name ML Reyersbach AG.

Oldenburg's first Landrabbiner (chief local rabbi) was Nathan Marcus Adler, who received his PhD in philosophy in 1823. After he left Oldenburg, he became the chief rabbi of the British Empire and one of the most influential orthodox Jews. His house was used as the town synagogue before a building was rented for this purpose years later.

=== 20th century ===
During the World War I several Jews from Oldenburg and nearby towns were killed in the battles. Plaques commemorating their names was placed in the local synagogue. In 1924, the local central office for the Jewish welfare was established, helping members of the community in need. Shortly after, another charity fund was founded under the name Gemilus Chassodim. In addition, a Jewish youth organization and Maccabi sports club branch were active in town, as well as the Israelite Women's association.

An archived news article published on January 14, 1932 in "The Israelite" newspaper depicts an antisemitic incident, as the outer walls of the synagogue were stained in anti-semitic symbols.

In 1933, 279 Jews lived in Oldenburg. Following that year's Nazi victory in elections, the Oldenburg Jewish community, like others in Germany, began to decline. A few Jewish businessmen closed their shops in 1933. Adolf de Beer, an owner of a large laundry business with branches also outside the city, closed his business in August 1936.

==== Kristallnacht ====
The town synagogue was destroyed in the 1938 Kristallnacht, as well as the last two Jewish stores still open on Kurwickstrasse. Most Jewish men were arrested and sent to the Sachsenhausen concentration camp for a number of weeks. Among them was also Rabbi Leo Trepp, the last surviving Rabbi, who led a community during the Holocaust. During that time he was in charge of 15 synagogues in the area of Oldenburg. As Jews were forbidden to attend the public schools, he got permission to establish a school in the synagogue building to educate Jewish boys. Trepp recalled being in Sachsenhausen for 18 days. Trepp is today an honorary citizen of the city of Oldenburg. Another resident, Henry Hirschberg recalled: "There were two SA men in the apartment, they were calling on the stairs loudly, police! Police! ... about 40 men were led past the still burning synagogue on November 10. From there we went through the busy shopping streets - such as Haarenstraße, Lange Straße, Schloßplatz and others - to prison. Mobs stood everywhere around...

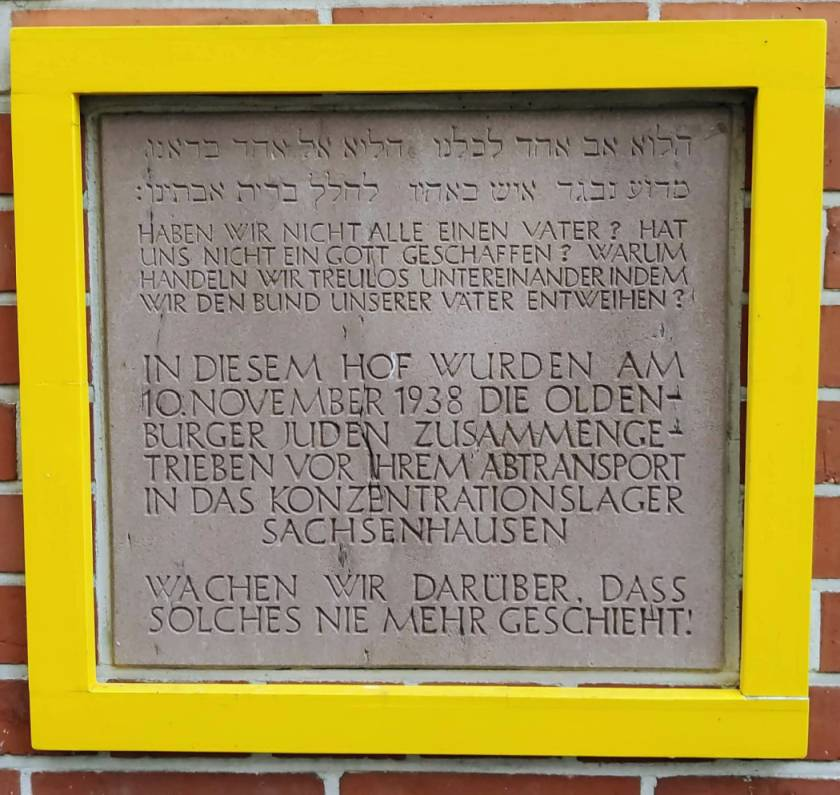
Memorial plaque to the deportation of Oldenburg Jews in 1938 (former police barracks Pferdemarkt)

school boys who apparently had no school because of Kristallnacht made fun of us". Since 1981, an annual commemoration walk (Erinnerungsgang) has been held by Oldenburg citizens in memory of the deportation of the Oldenburg Jews on November 10, 1938.

==== Holocaust ====
By 1939 only 96 Jews were left in Oldenburg, of whom 20 were forced to live in a single in Kurwickstrasse 5. Of the Jews who lived in Oldenburg in 1933, 62 emigrated to the Netherlands, 17 to Palestine (British Mandate), 36 to the United States or Canada, and others to the United Kingdom and South Africa. Some of them did not survive the Holocaust, nor did most of these who remained in town.

==== After the Holocaust and 21st century ====
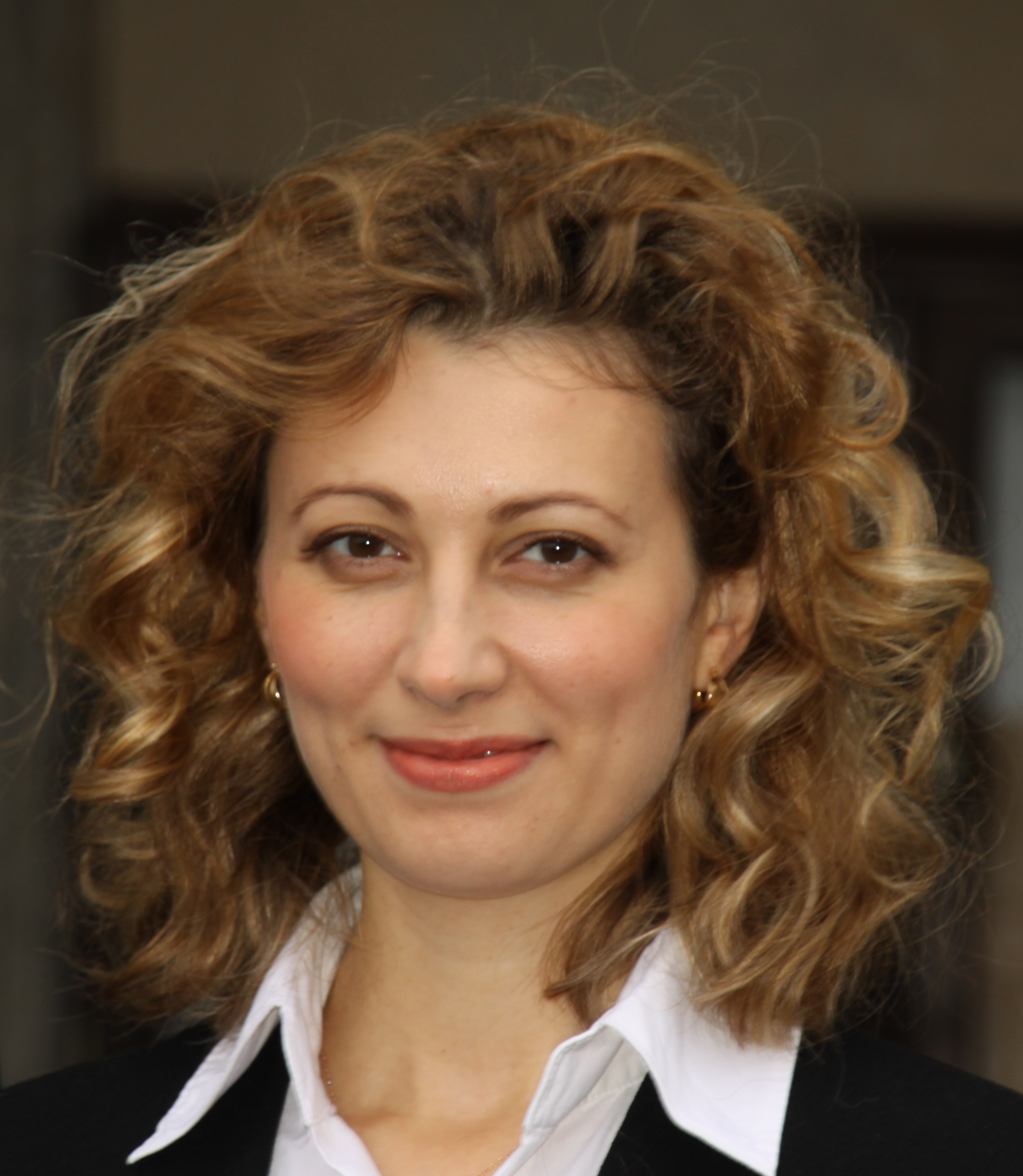
Alina Treiger, the Oldenburg congregation rabbi since 2010

After World War II about 23 Jewish survivors returned to Oldenburg and re-established a small Jewish community. A small prayer room was opened in 1948 at Cäcilienstrasse 9, but the community diminished to only four individuals towards the end of the 1960s, until it dissolved at the end of January 1971. During the 1990s, with immigration of former USSR Jews to Germany, about 34 Jewish immigrants established a new community in Oldenburg and in 2013 the Jewish community of Oldenburg numbered 315, about as many as before the Holocaust. During the second part of the 1990s, the rabbi of the congregation was Bea Wyler, the first female rabbi in Germany to officiate a congregation. Today, the congregation rabbi is Alina Treiger.

=== Places ===
==== Synagogue ====
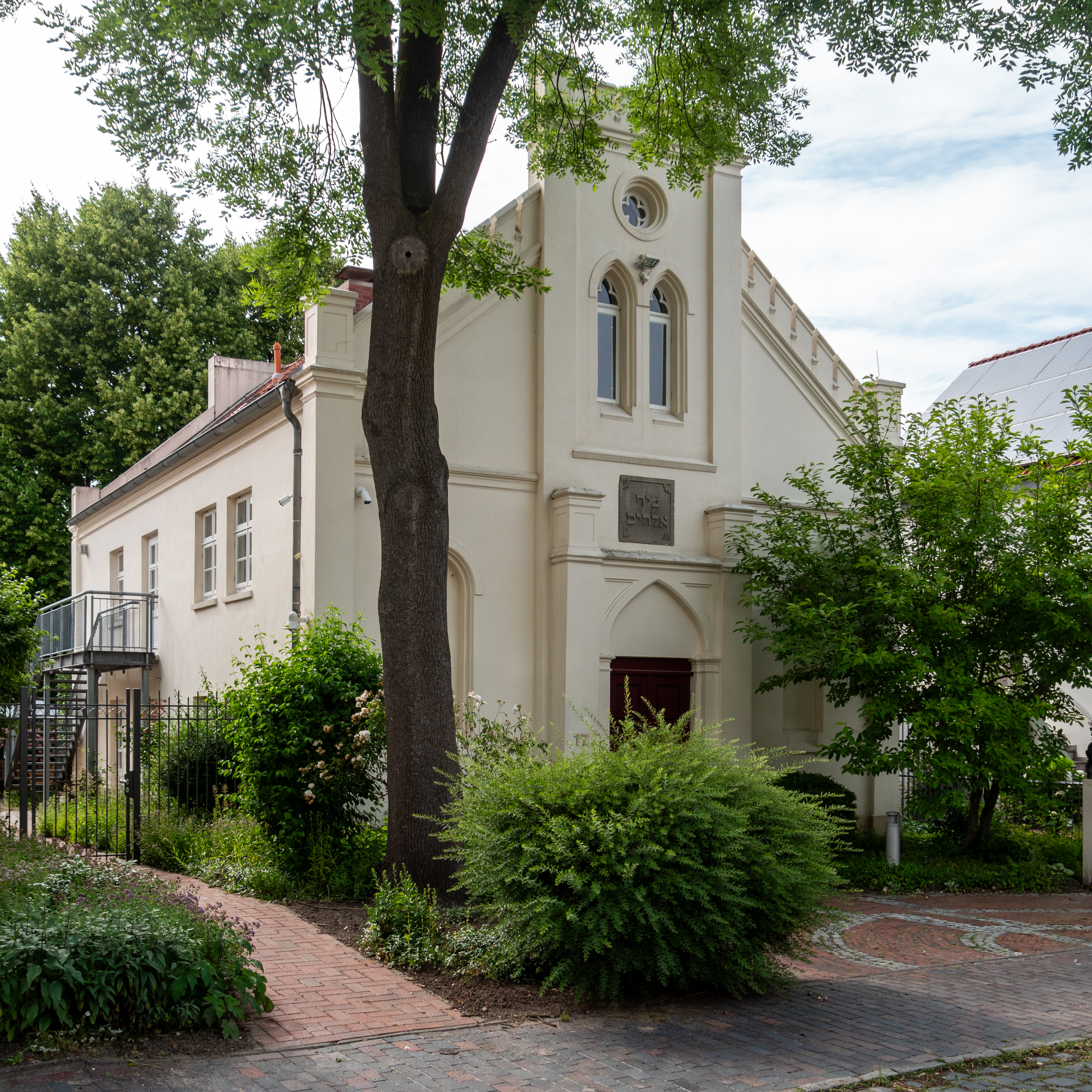
The present synagogue in the Baptist church building

Though a Jewish congregation had existed in Oldenburg long before the 19th century, the first synagogue was officially opened only on June 6, 1829, in a rented house on Mühlenstraße 5. The foundation stone for a new synagogue on Peter Street number 6 was laid on May 3, 1854 and its inauguration on August 24, 1855. Archived articles from the Allgemeine Zeitung des Judentums and the Israelits newspaper depict the opening of the newer synagogue. In 1904/5 the synagogue was expanded and a new Mikveh was also established.

The synagogue was burnt down by the Nazis during Kristallnacht in 1938. Between 1949 and 1950 the arsonists of the synagogue were tried and were sentenced to periods between nine months to two years. In 1967, a memorial stone was put in the side of the former synagogue building and another one, commemorating the victims of the Nazi regime, was put aside the first stone in 1990.

On March 5, 1995, a new synagogue was opened in the building of a former Baptist chapel, on Wilhelmstrasse 15-17 (later renamed as Leo-Trepp-Straße).

==== Cemetery ====
The Jewish community of Oldenburg acquired its own cemetery in 1814 at Ostenburg, which was then a rural suburb of Oldenburg, and the first burial was also held that year. Before 1814, the Jewish community in the city buried its deceased in nearby Varel. The cemetery was used not only by the Jews of Oldenburg but also by those of the nearby Elsfleth, Zwischenahn and Wardenburg. The cemetery was enlarged in 1862, and a wall was built around him a few years later. After his son died on 1918, merchant Leo Trommer built a funeral home at the cemetery commemorating his name. The funeral house was unsuccessfully set on fire on Kristallnacht, though its inventory was burned.

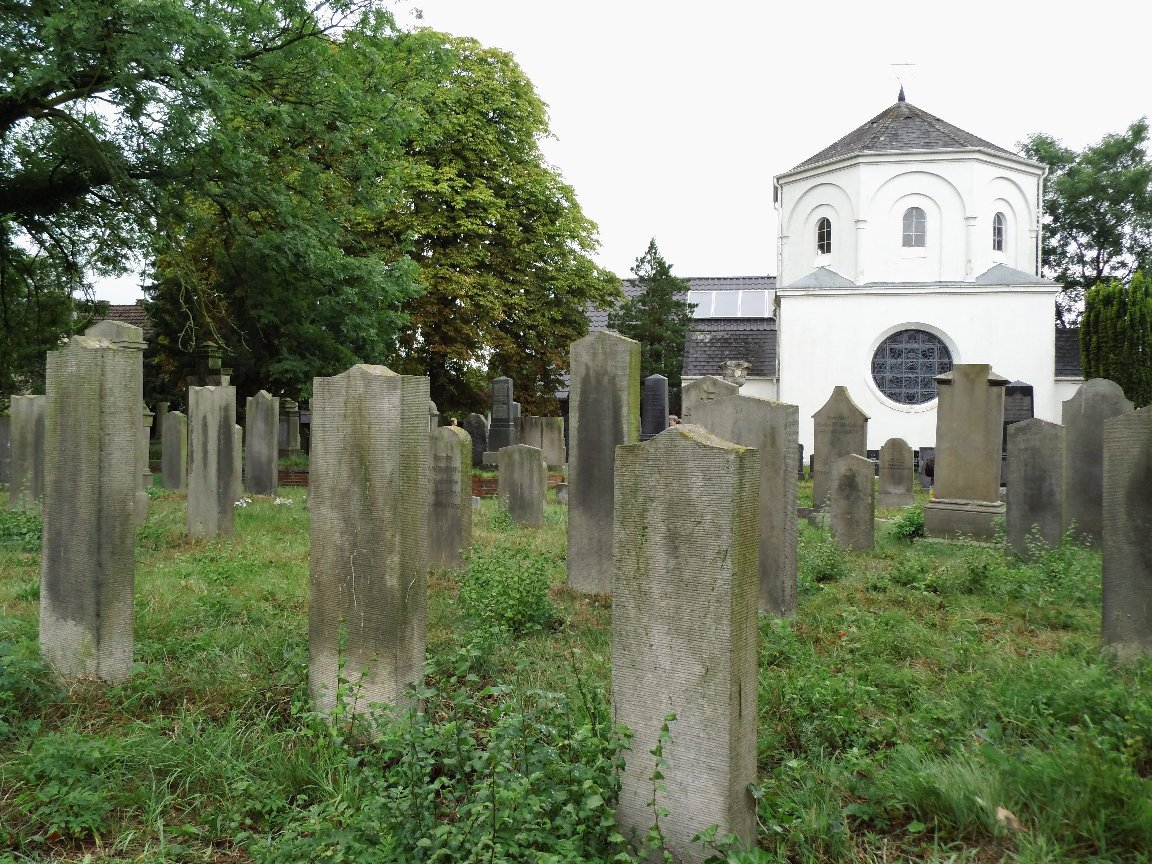
Oldenburg Jewish cemetery

Among those buried in the cemetery are Bernhard Wechsler, who served as the community chief Rabbi between 1841 and 1874, and David Mannheimer, who served as the Grand Duchy of Oldenburg chief Rabbi at the end of the 19th century and the beginning of the 20th century.

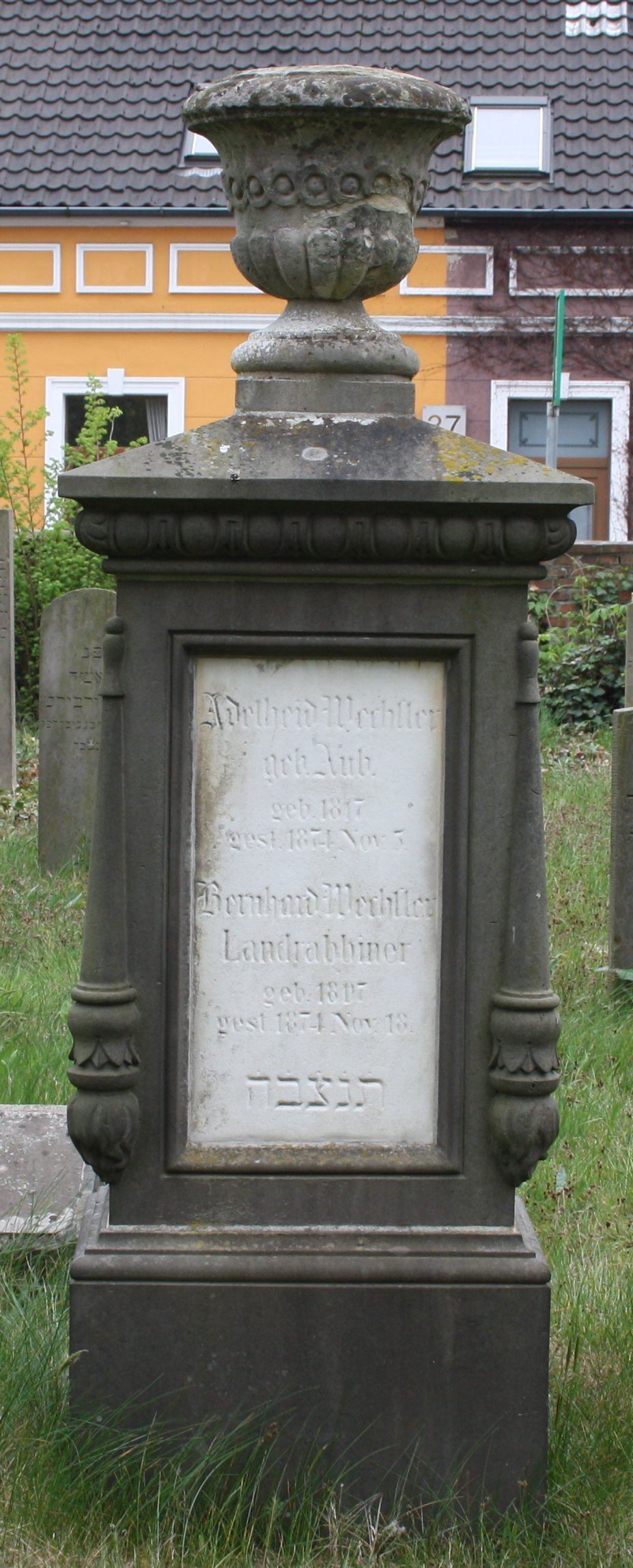
Rabbi Bernhard Wechsler and his wife Adelaide gravestone

During World War II, 54 Russian war prisoners were buried in a mass grave in the cemetery area. A memorial stone was put in their honor in 1950. During the years of the war, a small round bunker was built in the cemetery.

Over the years, the synagogue was desecrated a number of times by antisemites. On May 28, 1935, a number of gravestones were overturned and smashed. On 1938 Kristallnacht, the cemetery was unsuccessfully set on fire. The people who conducted the attack were sentenced in 1949 to a period of six months to one year in jail. On November 19, 2011, six gravestones in the cemetery were painted in white in what appears to be an anti-semitic act. One of the men in charge of the desecration was caught and sentenced to two years suspended sentence. On November 24, 2013, the cemetery was once again desecrated, and swastikas were painted on eight gravestones. In addition, the funeral house was also painted with the word "Jew" and other swastikas.

The cemetery stopped conducting burials in 2000, and another Jewish cemetery was opened about 5.5 km from the city center in the district Bümmerstede, Sandkruger Street, 26133 Oldenburg.

==== Leo Trepp Beth Midrash ====
The Beth midrash (study house) is a gathering place for the local Jewish community in which lectures and lessons are being taught at a daily basis, such as "Jewish women", "The use of field Rabbis during WWI" and others.

==== Jewish sunday school ====
A Sunday school operates on Leo Trepp st. 15–17.
