= Paula Ackerman =

First female rabbi in the United States

- פאולה אקרמן
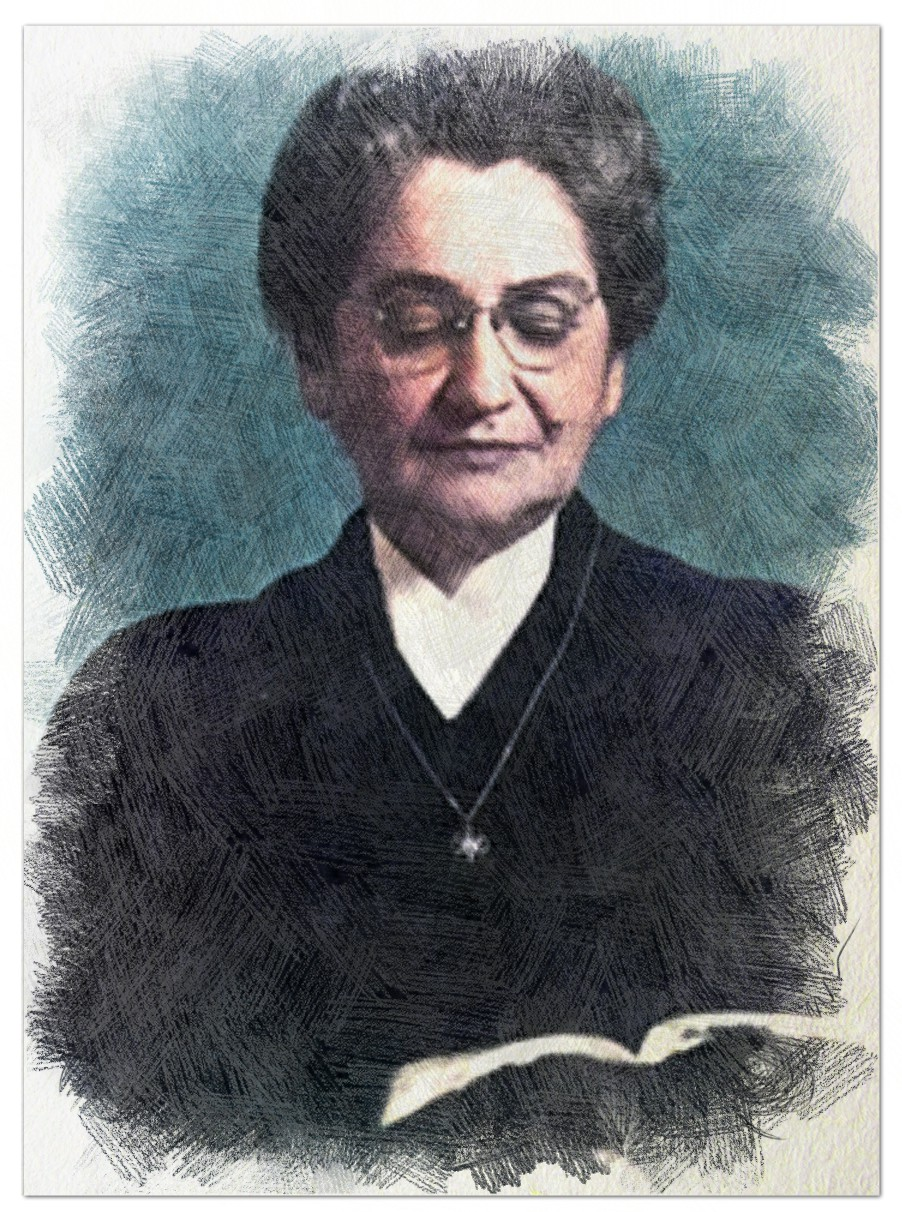

Personal life
- Born: Paula Herskovitz; December 7, 1893 Pensacola, Florida, U.S.
- Died: January 12, 1989 (aged 95) Thomaston, Georgia, U.S.
- Spouse: William Ackerman (m. 1919)

Paula Ackerman (Hebrew: פאולה אקרמן; December 7, 1893 – January 12, 1989) is thought to have been the first woman to perform rabbinical functions in the United States, leading the Beth Israel congregation in Meridian, Mississippi, from 1951 to 1953—making her the first woman to assume spiritual leadership of a mainstream American Jewish congregation—and the Temple Beth-El in Pensacola, Florida, briefly in the 1960s. She led the National Committee on Religious Schools for the National Federation of Temple Sisterhoods.

== Early life ==
She was born as Paula Herskovitz in Pensacola, Florida to Joseph Herskovitz (also Herschkovitz and Herskovitch), an immigrant from Romania, and Debora (née Lang), an immigrant from Germany. She had two brothers; both later changed their surnames to Hertz.

During World War I, she served as the secretary for the Pensacola branch of the National Jewish Welfare Board.

She married Rabbi William Ackerman in 1919, and the two of them lived in the same household in Pensacola with her parents and brothers per the 1920 United States census

In the mid-1930s, she served as the Mississippi president of the National Federation of Temple Sisterhoods (NFTS), a nationwide group for Jewish women affiliated with synagogues. NFTS is now known as Women of Reform Judaism (WRJ) and a major arm of Reform Judaism. From 1939 to 1945, she served on the organization's executive board.

As early as the 1930s, she was occasionally leading services at Temple Beth Israel in Meridian, Mississippi, where her husband was the rabbi. After his death from a heart attack, she became their leader and de facto rabbi from 1951 to 1953.

She continued to lead the congregation at Beth Israel until a replacement was found in September 1953, although she was never formally ordained.

The rabbinic functions undertaken by Ackerman that were publicly reported in the press include the offication of a wedding in Meridian in 1953<ref"Rosenbaum-Goff Nuptials Take Place in Meridian". The Daily Advertiser. 14 Jul 1953. p. 15.</ref> and a funeral in 1961. Because her work included performing marriages and funerals, the state legally recognized her status as a religious leader.

Regarding her chances of being selected for the job, Ackerman wrote to a friend, "I also know how revolutionary the idea is—therefore it seems to be a challenge that I pray I can meet. If I can just plant a seed for the Jewish woman's larger participation—if perhaps it will open a way for women students to train for congregational leadership—then my life would have some meaning." A woman would not be ordained in Reform Judaism until 1972, when Sally Priesand was formally made a rabbi. Ackerman later performed services at her home temple, Temple Beth-El in Pensacola, from 1962 until a replacement was found nine months later.

== Later life and death ==
In 1981, Ackerman moved from Pensacola to Atlanta, Georgia. She died in Thomaston, Georgia on January 12, 1989, aged 95.

== Legacy ==
In 1986, the Union of American Hebrew Congregations held a ceremony at The Temple in Atlanta to recognize Ackerman's contribution to Jewish communal life.

Some of Ackerman's papers are held in the American Jewish Archives, in Cincinnati, Ohio.

The novel The Rabbi Is a Lady (1987) by Alex J. Goldman, was likely inspired by Ackerman's life story. In the novel, the widow of a conservative rabbi who is appointed to her late husband's pulpit. The work is also one of the earliest inclusions of women rabbis as literary figures to appear in American Jewish literature.

== See also ==
- Timeline of women rabbis
- List of Reform rabbis
- Regina Jonas
- Sally Priesand
- Amy Eilberg
