= Bea Wyler =

Bea Wyler (born 1951 in Baden, Switzerland) is the second female rabbi in Germany (the first being Regina Jonas) and the first to officiate at a congregation.

== Life ==
Bea Wyler grew up in Wettingen, Aargau, studied at ETH Zurich agriculture with a specialization in poultry farming, and worked as an agricultural journalist. The Basler Zeitung hired her as its first science editor in 1980, where she headed the science resort. She then worked for a chemical company in Basel in the public relations department and was responsible for publications of the company.

After a stay in Israel, she studied in London at Leo Baeck College and in New York at the Jewish Theological Seminary. In May 1995, at the age of 44, she was ordained as rabbi by the JTS.

== First female rabbi serving a German congregation ==
Bea Wyler was the first female rabbi appointed to a German congregation. The first female rabbi in Germany (and worldwide) had been Regina Jonas, whom Rabbi Max Dienemann had ordained in 1935. Rabbi Jonas preached in several Berlin synagogues from the 1930s to the 1940s and also served as rabbi there after her deportation to the Ghetto Theresienstadt in captivity.

Bea Wyler was appointed in the year of her ordination, 1995, to serve the Conservative Jewish synagogue of Oldenburg. Her appointment was much criticized by Ignatz Bubis, the head of the Central Council of Jews in Germany, who generally opposed the appointment of female rabbis, saying that he would not visit a service led by her. As of 2000 she was Germany's only Conservative rabbi. She served as a rabbi in Oldenburg, Brunswick and Delmenhorst until 2004, over a decade in which Jews from the former USSR came to Germany. The congregation in Oldenburg grew from 90 to 350 members under her rabbinate. Her direct successor in Oldenburg in 2004 was Jonah Sievers; in 2010 however, her second successor became Alina Treiger who had been ordained as the first female graduate at Abraham Geiger College in Potsdam.

In May 2004, for family reasons Bea Wyler resigned from her posts in Germany and returned to Switzerland. Since, she has been active primarily in teaching and publishing, but also holds synagogal services at various places, e.g. in Basel.

In June 2021, Bea Wyler received an honorary doctorate from the Jewish Theological Seminary (JTS) in New York in recognition of her contribution to Jewish life.

== See also ==
- Timeline of women rabbis
