= Jacob Rader Marcus =

American scholar of Jewish history and Reform rabbi (1896-1995)

- Born: March 5, 1896
- Died: November 14, 1995 (aged 99)
- Notable work: The Jew in the Medieval World: A Source Book: 315-1791
- Theological work
- Tradition or movement: Hebrew Union College

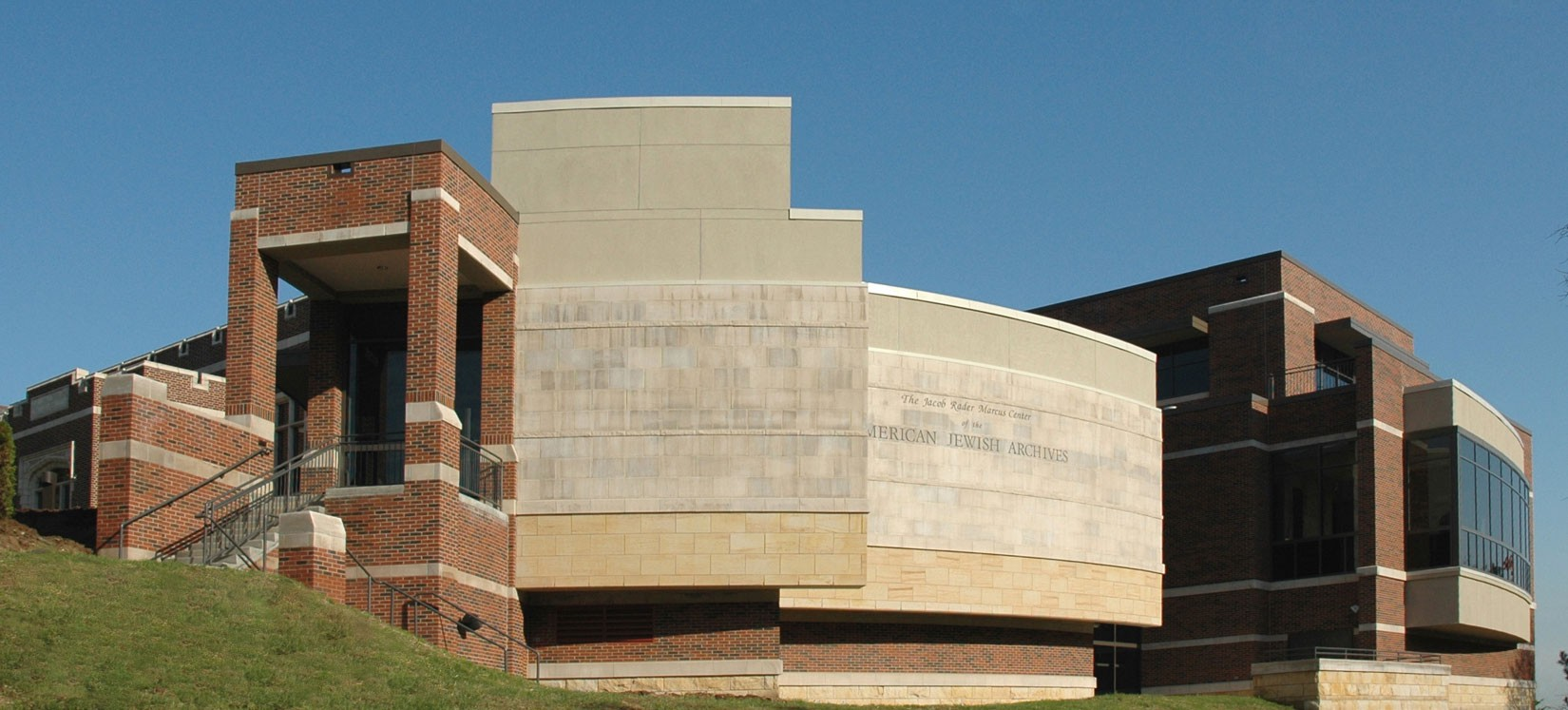
The Jacob Rader Marcus Center of the American Jewish Archives

Jacob Rader Marcus (March 5, 1896 –14 November 1995) was a scholar of Jewish history and a Reform rabbi.

== Biography ==
Born in Connellsville, Pennsylvania, United States into an Orthodox Jewish family. His parents, Aaron and Jennie Rader Marcus, were immigrants from Vidz, Lithuania. Marcus became interested in Reform Judaism at the age of 15. At that time, he traveled to Hebrew Union College (HUC), in Cincinnati, Ohio, to begin his rabbinical training.

After a two-year interim during World War I, when he served in the American military, Marcus returned to graduate studies in Cincinnati. After receiving rabbinical ordination in 1920, Marcus was appointed to the faculty of HUC, where he began teaching biblical history. In 1922, Marcus traveled to Berlin to study Jewish history with Ismar Elbogen, who awarded Marcus a Ph.D. in 1925. In that year, Marcus married Antoinette Brody in Paris. The couple had one daughter, Merle, who was born in 1929. After briefly studying at Hebrew University in Jerusalem in 1926, Marcus returned to Cincinnati, where he lectured at HUC consistently until 1995. In 1959, he was named the Adolph S. Ochs Professor of American Jewish History. In 1965, he was appointed to HUC's Milton and Hattie Kutz Distinguished Service Chair in American Jewish History.

Marcus devoted most of his post-World War II historical career to American Jewish history and founded the American Jewish Archives in Cincinnati in 1947 on the campus of HUC. Although he is considered to be the first trained historian of the Jewish people born in America, he is, perhaps, best known for his work on Medieval European Jewish history, The Jew in the Medieval World: A Source Book: 315-1791, first published in 1938.

In the 1970s, while director of the American Jewish Archives, Marcus publicly shared the account of Regina Jonas in response to the ordination of Rabbi Sally Priesand in 1972. Marcus informed The American Israelite in July 1973 that the only other known Jewish woman to receive ordination was Regina Jonas of Berlin but that she perished at the hands of the Nazi regime. Marcus also provided the title of Jonas' thesis, "Can a Woman Become a Rabbi?".

In 1949, he was elected president of the Central Conference of American Rabbis (CCAR), a position he served in until 1951.

Marcus died on the eve of November 14, 1995, at the age of 99.

Marcus was the mentor of Jonathan Sarna.

== Works ==
- The Rise and Destiny of the German Jew. Cincinnati: Union of American Hebrew Congregations, 1934.
- The Jew in the Medieval World: A Source Book, 315-1791. Cincinnati: Union of American Hebrew Congregations, 1938.
- Communal Sick-Care in the German Ghetto. Cincinnati: The Hebrew Union College Press, 1947
- Early American Jewry, Volume 1: The Jews of New York, New England, and Canada, 1649-1794. Philadelphia: Jewish Publication Society of America, 1951.
- Early American Jewry, Volume 2: The Jews of Pennsylvania and the South, 1655-1790. Philadelphia: Jewish Publication Society of America, 1953.
- Memoirs of American Jews, 1775-1865. Philadelphia: Jewish Publication Society of America, 1955.
- On Love, Marriage, Children...and Death, Too: Intimate Glimpses into the Lives of American Jews in a Bygone Age as * Told in Their Own Words. Cincinnati: Society of Jewish Bibliophiles, 1964.
- Studies in American Jewish History: Studies and Addresses. Cincinnati: The Hebrew Union College Press, 1969.
- The Colonial American Jew, 1492–1776: Volume I, II, and III. Detroit: Wayne State UP, 1970
- Israel Jacobson: The Founder of the Reform Movement in Judaism. Cincinnati: The Hebrew Union College Press, 1972.
- The American Jewish Woman, A Documentary History. Hoboken, NJ: Ktav 1981.
- To Count a People: American Jewish Population Data, 1585 — 1984. Lanham, MD: UP of America, 1990.
- United States Jewry 1776–1985. Vol. 1: The Sephardic Period Detroit: Wayne State University Press, 1989. 820 pp.
- United States Jewry 1776–1985. Vol. 2: The Germanic Period. Detroit: Wayne State University Press, 1991. 419 pp.
- United States Jewry 1776–1985. Vol. 3: The Germanic Period, Part 2. Detroit: Wayne State University Press, 1993. 925 pp.
- United States Jewry 1776–1985. Vol. 4: The East European Period: The Emergence of the American Jew; Epilogue. Detroit: Wayne State University Press, 1993. 955 pp.
- The Concise Dictionary of American Jewish Biography. Brooklyn: Carlson Publishing, 1994.
- The Jew in the American World: a source book. Detroit: Wayne State University Press, 1996.
