= Gary P. Zola =

American rabbi

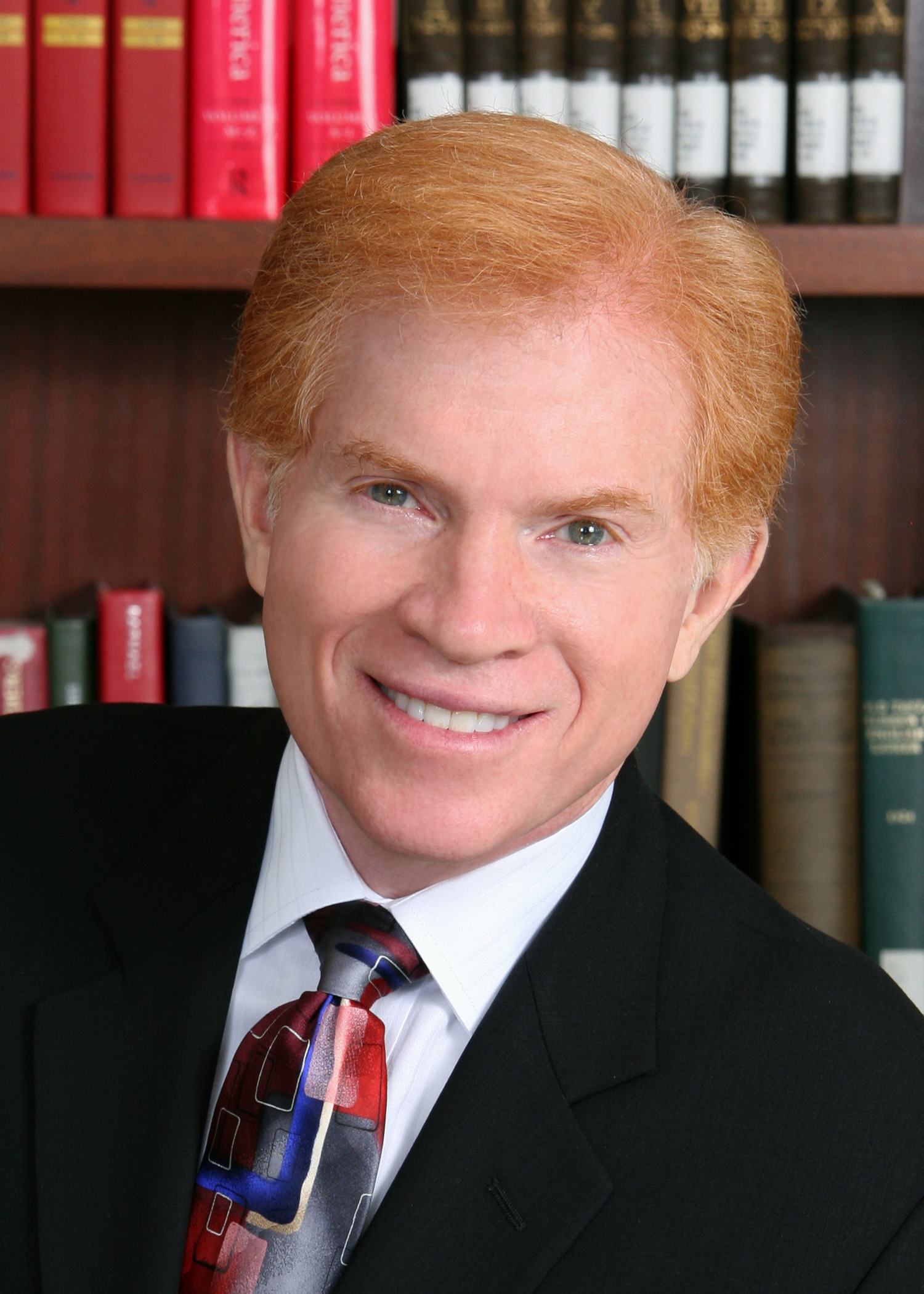
Gary Phillip Zola (2012)

Gary Phillip Zola is the former executive director of The Jacob Rader Marcus Center of the American Jewish Archives (AJA) and Edward M. Ackerman Family Distinguished Professor of the American Jewish Experience & Reform Jewish History at Hebrew Union College-Jewish Institute of Religion (HUC-JIR) in Cincinnati. Since 1998, he has served as the second executive director of The Jacob Rader Marcus Center of the American Jewish Archives (AJA), succeeding his teacher and mentor, Jacob Rader Marcus (1896–1995). He is also editor of The Marcus Center's award-winning semi-annual publication, The American Jewish Archives Journal.

Zola served as the organizer and chair of the congressionally-recognized Commission for Commemorating 350 Years of American Jewish History, a consortium of leading research institutions established to promote the study of American Jewish history during the 350th anniversary Jewish life in America (2004–2005). In 2006, Zola became the first American Jewish historian to receive appointment to the Academic Advisory Council of the congressionally-recognized Abraham Lincoln Bicentennial Commission.

In addition to these national activities, Zola has been actively involved in community relations in Cincinnati, Ohio. In May 2009, the Cincinnati Human Relations Commission conferred the Bishop Herbert Thompson, Jr. Outstanding Humanitarian Award on Zola in recognition of his service to the people of the greater Cincinnati metropolitan area. The Jewish Federation of Cincinnati recognized Zola's service to Cincinnati's Jewish community in 2004 by awarding him its Distinguished Leadership Award.

In 2011, President Barack Obama appointed Zola to serve as a member of the U.S. Commission for the Preservation of America's Heritage Abroad. Although HUC-JIR presidents have received such distinctions over the years, Zola is the first regular member of the College-Institute's faculty to serve on a standing commission of the United States Government in the history of the school.

In the spring of 2022, Zola retired from his position at HUC-JIR citing the recent changes to the graduate programs there.

== Education ==
Zola holds a Bachelor of Arts degree, with distinction, from the University of Michigan in Ann Arbor (1973), and a Master of Arts degree in Counseling Psychology from Northwestern University in Evanston, Illinois (1976). He earned a Master of Arts in Hebrew Letters (1981), Rabbinic Ordination (1982), a Master of Philosophy (1988) from HUC-JIR. Zola received his Ph.D. in American Jewish History from HUC-JIR in 1991.

== Books ==
- We Called Him Rabbi Abraham: Lincoln and American Jewry (Carbondale, IL: Southern Illinois University Press, 2014).
- American Jewish History: A Primary Source Reader (Waltham, MA: Brandeis University Press, 2014) with Marc Dollinger
- The Americanization of the Jewish Prayer Book and the Liturgical Development of Congregation Ahawath Chesed, New York City (New York: Central Synagogue, 2008).
- Isaac Harby of Charleston by Gary P. Zola (Tuscaloosa, AL: University of Alabama Press, 1994).
- The piece "From Generation to Generation: A Roundtable Discussion

== Pieces ==
"JTS, HUC, and Women Rabbis—Redux", in the book The Sacred Calling: Four Decades of Women in the Rabbinate, published in 2016.

== Edited volumes ==
- A Place of Our Own : the Rise of Reform Jewish Camping : Essays Honoring the Fiftieth Anniversary of Olin-Sang-Ruby Union Institute, URJ, in Oconomowoc, Wisconsin edited with an introduction by Gary P. Zola and Michael M. Lorge (Tuscaloosa, AL: University of Alabama Press, 2006).
- The Dynamics of American Jewish History: Jacob Rader Marcus's Essays on American Jewry, edited with introduction and notes by Gary P. Zola (Waltham, MA: Brandeis University Press, 2004).
- Women Rabbis: Exploration and Celebration edited by Gary P. Zola (Cincinnati: HUC-JIR Rabbinic Alumni Association Press, 1996).
- Hebrew Union College-Jewish Institute of Religion -- A Centennial History, 1875–1975 written by Michael A. Meyer and edited by Gary P. Zola (Cincinnati: Hebrew Union College Press, 1992).
- To Learn and to Teach: Your Future as a Rabbi written by Alfred Gottschalk and revised by Gary P. Zola (New York: Rosen Publishing Group, 1988).
