= Howard Eilberg-Schwartz =

American scholar and writer (born 1956)

Howard Eilberg‑Schwartz
- Born: 1956 (age 69–70); Baltimore, Maryland, U.S.
- Education: Duke University (B.A.); Jewish Theological Seminary of America (rabbinic ordination); Brown University (Ph.D.)
- Occupations: Scholar, Writer
- Organizations: Indiana University; Temple University; Stanford University; San Francisco State University
- Known for: Anthropological approach to Jewish texts; contributions to gender, sexuality, and cultural analysis in Jewish studies
- Notable work: The Savage in Judaism: An Anthropology of Israelite Religion and Ancient Judaism (1990); God’s Phallus and Other Problems for Men and Monotheism (1994)
- Spouse: (formerly) Amy Eilberg (divorced 1992)
- Children: 1 (daughter)

Howard Eilberg-Schwartz (born 1956) is an American scholar of Judaism whose work has addressed anthropology, gender, sexuality, and Jewish religious texts. He taught at several universities before leaving academia in the mid-1990s.

== Early life and education ==
Eilberg-Schwartz was born into a Jewish family in 1956 in Baltimore, Maryland. At Duke University, Eilberg-Schwartz became more interested in Judaism after a Christian roommate attempted to convert him. He later enrolled at the Jewish Theological Seminary of America (JTS) and studied for the rabbinate. While at JTS, he delivered a senior sermon on Jewish laws concerning menstruation that drew criticism within the institution. Nevertheless, he was ultimately ordained as a Conservative rabbi.

He later earned a Ph.D. at Brown University, where he studied with Jacob Neusner. During his doctoral studies, Eilberg-Schwartz applied anthropological methods to Jewish texts and analyzed them in broader cultural contexts.

== Academic career ==
Eilberg-Schwartz' first academic appointment was at Indiana University where he taught religious studies in the mid-1980s. He then taught for one year at Temple University.

He became a faculty member at Stanford University in the early 1990s but was denied tenure, reportedly due to the provocative nature of his scholarship. In 1994, he was hired by San Francisco State University with full tenure to direct its newly created Jewish Studies program. His appointment came amid tensions on campus, including controversy over an anti-Semitic mural and longstanding concerns from the local Jewish community about anti-Jewish hostility at SFSU.

== Academic contributions ==
Eilberg-Schwartz's scholarship examined Judaism through anthropological approaches to religion, gender, and sexuality. In The Savage in Judaism (1990), he criticized the distinction often drawn between Judaism and so-called "primitive" religions and drew on the structural anthropology of Claude Lévi-Strauss. In God's Phallus and Other Problems for Men and Monotheism (1994), he examined representations of God as male and the relationship between sexuality and Jewish theology. The book also considered the effects of male-centered conceptions of God on Jewish religious life.

He wrote or edited other books and published articles and essays, including one in Tikkun magazine, where he controversially questioned the Jewish ritual of circumcision.

== San Francisco State University controversy ==
In 1994, Eilberg-Schwartz was hired with tenure as the founding director of the new Jewish Studies program at San Francisco State University (SFSU). The program was established during a period of disputes on campus involving pro-Israel Jewish students and pro-Palestinian activists. Local Jewish organizations had supported the creation of the program, in part as a response to those disputes.

Eilberg-Schwartz disagreed with some of the local organizations and donors over the direction of the program and his responses to campus disputes involving Israel and antisemitism.

In one highly publicized incident, Eilberg-Schwartz invited Palestinian activist Hatem Bazian to speak in his classroom. Although Eilberg-Schwartz defended the decision as an opportunity for dialogue, critics considered it poor judgment, especially in light of Bazian's past criticisms of Israel and Jewish students.

In fall 1995, Eilberg-Schwartz resigned from SFSU with two weeks’ notice.

== Reception and later views ==
Scholars Sander Gilman and David Biale have discussed Eilberg-Schwartz as part of a group of scholars who brought gender, sexuality, and cultural analysis into Jewish studies. In later interviews, Eilberg-Schwartz said that he had become critical of institutional Jewish life and no longer participated in synagogue or Jewish communal organizations.

== Later career ==
After leaving academia, Eilberg-Schwartz found work in the high tech industry and has continued to publish articles and books. He currently is known as Howard I. Schwartz.

== Personal life ==
Eilberg-Schwartz was married to Rabbi Amy Eilberg, the first woman to be ordained as a rabbi in the Conservative movement. They divorced in 1992. He has one daughter.

== Selected works ==
- The Human Will in Judaism: The Mishnah’s Philosophy of Intention. Scholars Press, 1986. ISBN 978-0-89130-938-3.
- The Savage in Judaism: An Anthropology of Israelite Religion and Ancient Judaism. Indiana University Press, 1990. ISBN 978-0-253-20584-1.
- People of the Body: Jews and Judaism from an Embodied Perspective. State University of New York Press, 1992. ISBN 978-1-4384-0190-4.
- God’s Phallus and Other Problems for Men and Monotheism. Beacon Press, 1994. ISBN 9780807012246.
- Off with Her Head! The Denial of Women’s Identity in Myth, Religion, and Culture. University of California Press, 1995. ISBN 978-0-520-08839-9. (Wendy Doniger, co-editor).
