= Sandy Eisenberg Sasso =

American writer and rabbi (born 1947)

Sandy Eisenberg Sasso (born January 29, 1947) is the first woman to have been ordained a rabbi in Reconstructionist Judaism. She was ordained by the Reconstructionist Rabbinical College in Philadelphia, on May 19, 1974. She is also the author of many children's books on religious topics.

== Biography ==
=== Youth and early life ===
Sasso was born in 1947 in Philadelphia, Pennsylvania. In her youth, she was very involved in her Philadelphia Reform congregation and began to consider entering the rabbinate at 16 years old, though she knew that such a role had never been open to women. During this period she studied at Gratz College.

=== Rabbinical school ===
In the fall of 1969, Sasso joined the Reconstructionist Rabbinical College's second class of rabbinical students. (Note: When the Reconstructionist Rabbinical College was founded by Mordecai Kaplan in 1968, it was assumed that women would be welcome as students. Sandy Eisenberg Sasso was accepted without debate or subsequent controversy.) While in school, Sandy Eisenberg married her classmate, Dennis Sasso, making them the first rabbinical couple in Jewish history. As one of the few women rabbinical students, Sasso naturally became a leader in defining women's changing roles within Judaism. (Note: Reconstructionist women rabbis have been instrumental in the creation of rituals, stories, music, and theologies that have begun to give women's experience a voice in Judaism.) Sasso holds title to many firsts as a female rabbi.

=== Rabbinical life ===
Sasso served as rabbi of the Manhattan Reconstructionist Congregation and, from 1977 until 2013, as rabbi along with her husband at the congregation Beth-El Zedeck in Indianapolis, making the Sassos the world's first couple to serve jointly as rabbis.

Sasso appeared in a 2005 documentary, titled And the Gates Opened: Women in the Rabbinate, which features stories of and interviews with her, rabbi Sally Priesand, and rabbi Amy Eilberg.

On December 6, 2010, at Temple Reyim in Newton, Massachusetts, Sandy Eisenberg Sasso met for the first time with Sally Priesand, the first Reform female rabbi, Amy Eilberg, the first Conservative female rabbi, and Sara Hurwitz, considered by some to be the first Orthodox female rabbi. They and approximately 30 other women rabbis lit Hanukkah candles and then spoke about their experiences in an open forum.

On June 3, 2012, Priesand, Sasso, Eilberg, and Hurwitz met again, this time at Monmouth Reform Temple at a celebration honoring the four first women rabbis to be ordained in their respective movements, and the 40th anniversary of Priesand's ordination.

In May 2013, Sasso retired as senior rabbi of Beth-El Zedeck.

== Works ==
=== Children's books ===
- God's Paintbrush, illustrated by Annette C. Compton, Jewish Lights Publishing (Woodstock, VT), 1992.
- In God's Name, illustrated by Phoebe Stone, Jewish Lights Publishing (Woodstock, Vermont), 1994.
- But God Remembered: Stories of Women from Creation to the Promised Land, Jewish Lights Publishing (Woodstock, Vermont), 1995.
- A Prayer for the Earth: The Story of Naamah, Noah's Wife, illustrated by Bethanne Andersen, Jewish Lights Publishing (Woodstock, Vermont), 1996.
- God in Between, illustrated by Sally Sweetland, Jewish Lights Publishing (Woodstock, Vermont), 1998.
- For Heaven's Sake, illustrated by Kathryn Kunz Finney, Jewish Lights Publishing (Woodstock, Vermont), 1999.
- God's Paintbrush, Jewish Lights Publishing (Woodstock, Vermont), 1999.
- What Is God's Name?, Jewish Lights Publishing (Woodstock, Vermont), 1999.
- God Said Amen, Jewish Lights Publishing (Woodstock, Vermont), 2000.
- Cain and Abel: Finding the Fruits of Peace, illustrated by Joani Keller Rothenberg, Jewish Lights Publishing (Woodstock, Vermont), 2001.
- Naamah, Noah's Wife, illustrated by Bethanne Andersen, Jewish Lights Publishing (Woodstock, Vermont), 2002.
- Adam and Eve's First Sunset: God's New Day, illustrated by Joani Keller Rothenberg, Jewish Lights Publishing (Woodstock, Vermont), 2003.
- Abuelita's Secret Matzahs, Emmis Books (Cincinnati), 2005.
- Butterflies under Our Hats, Paraclete Press (Orleans), 2006.
- The Shema in the Mezuzah: Listening to Each Other, Jewish Lights Publishing, 2012.
- Regina Persisted: An Untold Story, illustrated by Margeaux Lucas, Apples & Honey Press, 2018.

=== Other works ===
- Call Them Builders: A Resource Booklet about Jewish Attitudes and Practices on Birth and Family Life, Reconstructionist Federation of Congregations and Havurot (New York), 1977.
- The Voices of Children, Co-editor with Siddur Kol HaNoar, Reconstructionist Press, 2005.
- God's Echo – Exploring Scripture with Midrash, Paraclete Press (Orleans), 2010.
- "How Jewish Women Have Come to Read the Bible: The Creating of Midrash" in The Sacred Calling: Four Decades of Women in the Rabbinate, CCAR Press, 2016.

== Awards and honors ==
Sasso has been honored throughout her career:

- Honorary Doctor of Humanities, DePauw University, 1986.
- Special Merit award, Vermont Book Publishers, 1992, for God's Paintbrush.
- Children's Books of Distinction Award finalist, 1994, for In God's Name.
- Best books of the year honor, Publishers Weekly, 1995, for But God Remembered: Stories of Women from Creation to the Promised Land.
- Best books of the year honor, Publishers Weekly, 1996, for A Prayer for the Earth.
- Sagamore of the Wabash award, Governor of the State of Indiana, 1995.
- Named among Influential Women in Indiana, Indianapolis Business Journal, 1997.
- Honorary D.H.L., Butler University, Indianapolis, 1999.
- Honorary Doctor of Divinity, Reconstructionist Rabbinical College, 1999.
- Honorary degree, Christian Theological Seminary, 2000.
- Helen Keating Ott Award for Outstanding Contribution to Children's Literature, 2004.
- National Jewish Book Award in the Illustrated Children's Book category for The Shema in the Mezuzah: Listening to Each Other, 2012. Illustration by Joani Keller Rothenberg.
- The Doctor of Humane Letters, honoris causa, Hebrew Union College-Jewish Institute of Religion, 2013.
- The 2022 art exhibit “Holy Sparks”, shown among other places at the Dr. Bernard Heller Museum, featured art about twenty-four female rabbis who were firsts in some way; Debra Band created the artwork about Sasso that was in that exhibit.

== See also ==
- Timeline of women rabbis
