= Elisa Klapheck =

Elisa Klapheck (born 10 December 1962) is the first female rabbi to serve in the Netherlands, although she was born in Germany. She was also one of the organizers of Bet Debora Berlin, a conference of European women rabbis, cantors, scholars, and rabbinically-educated Jews in Berlin in 1999. She was ordained in 2004 by the Aleph Rabbinic Program, and in 2005 she became the rabbi of "Beit Ha'Chidush" (House of Renewal) in Amsterdam. In 2009 she returned to Germany and has since been the rabbi of the "Egalitarian Minyan" in the Jewish Community of Frankfurt am Main. She is a member of the General Conference of Rabbis of Germany (ARK) and an associate member of the Rabbinic Board of "Liberal Judaism" in London.

Klapheck is also the author of Fraulein Rabbiner Jonas: The Story of the First Woman Rabbi, as well as How I Became a Rabbi, Jewish Challenges Here and Now.

She was profiled in the book Turning the Kaleidoscope: Perspectives on European Jewry. There is also an entry on her in Jewish Women: A Comprehensive Historical Encyclopedia. In 2010, she was featured in the documentary Kol Ishah: The Rabbi is a Woman, directed by Hannah Heer.

== Publications ==
- Fräulein Rabbiner Jonas : the story of the first woman rabbi, 2004
- Margarete Susman und ihr jüdischer Beitrag zur politischen Philosophie, 2013
- Regina Jonas : die weltweit erste Rabbinerin, 2003
- Wie ich Rabbinerin wurde, 2012
- So bin ich Rabbinerin geworden jüdische Herausforderungen hier und jetzt, 2005
- Säkulares Judentum aus religiöser Quelle, 2015

== See also ==
- Regina Jonas
- Timeline of women rabbis
