= Sally Priesand =

First female ordained rabbi in America (born 1946)

Rabbi Sally Jane Priesand

Personal life
- Born: June 27, 1946 (age 80) Cleveland, Ohio, U.S.
- Parents: Irving Theodore Priesand (father); Rose Elizabeth (Welch) Priesand (mother)

Religious life
- Religion: Judaism

Jewish leader
- Synagogue: Stephen Wise Free Synagogue, Temple Beth El, Lenox Hill Hospital, Monmouth Reform Temple
- Began: 1972
- Ended: 2006

Sally Jane Priesand (born June 27, 1946) is America's first female rabbi ordained by a rabbinical seminary, and the second formally ordained female rabbi in Jewish history, after Regina Jonas. Priesand was ordained by the Hebrew Union College-Jewish Institute of Religion on June 3, 1972, at the Plum Street Temple in Cincinnati. After her ordination she served first as assistant and then as associate rabbi at Stephen Wise Free Synagogue in New York City, and later led Monmouth Reform Temple in Tinton Falls, New Jersey from 1981 until her retirement in 2006. She is featured in numerous books including Rabbis: The Many Faces of Judaism and Fifty Jewish Women who Changed the World.

== Early life and education ==
Sally Jane Priesand was born June 27, 1946, in Cleveland, Ohio into a Jewish family. Her parents, Irving Theodore, an engineer, and Rose Elizabeth (Welch) Priesand were not religiously observant but they were active in Jewish organizations. Her mother served as president of the sisterhood of their temple, while her father was president of a B'nai B'rith lodge. Her family lit Shabbat candles, celebrated Chanukah and had a Passover Seder to which the children were encouraged to invite a non-Jewish friend to share in the festivities and learn about Judaism.

The family first attended a non-egalitarian Conservative synagogue, and later attended Beth Israel-West Temple, a Reform congregation on Cleveland's West Side, where Priesand began to display a commitment to Judaism and Jewish life as a teenager. Priesand did not become Bat Mitzvah but was confirmed and continued her religious school education through the twelfth grade. At the age of 16, she decided she wanted to be a rabbi. She later described her decision to become a rabbi as "an affirmation of my belief in God, in the worth of each individual, and in Judaism as a way of life."

While still in high school, she requested admission information from Hebrew Union College-Jewish Institute of Religion in Cincinnati (HUC-JIR). In answer to her letter, the school responded:

"We are pleased to learn of your interest in our college. ... Since you state in your letter that your interests lean specifically to the rabbinate, we would have to inform you candidly that we do not know what opportunities exist for women in the active rabbinate, since we have, as yet, not ordained any women."

Another letter stated:

"... You might also ascertain from Rabbi Litt, and he in turn from other rabbis, just what would be the disposition of the rabbinate respecting someone like you who is interested in being ordained by the College-Institute. While we have had women students, none so far, has taken the full course of study which would lead to graduation and ordination as a rabbi. Therefore, some clear knowledge on your part of what it will mean to you to have graduated from our school is essential for you prior to your thinking about entering. The question of a woman as a rabbi is a question for the rabbis rather than for the school. There is no attempt on our part to discourage you but to direct your thinking. ... "

Entering the University of Cincinnati in 1964, she was accepted into the joint program of HUC-JIR and the University of Cincinnati. She graduated with a Bachelor of Hebrew Letters and a Bachelor of Arts degree in English from HUC-JIR and the University of Cincinnati in 1968.

=== Rabbinic school ===
Upon her graduation, she was admitted to HUC-JIR's rabbinic school without undergoing a formal application process, being the only woman among 35 men. While still in rabbinical school, she received a great deal of attention from the media. In April 1971, she was the subject of an article in The New York Times, titled "Her Ambition Is to Become a Rabbi – And a Housewife", in which she stated:

"I'm not an active supporter of women's lib. ... I don't need it. But I do think the feminist movement is important because it is time for us to overcome psychological and emotional objections. We must fulfill our potential as creative individuals."

Despite opposition – many said she was at HUC-JIR to marry a rabbi and become a rebbetzin rather than to officiate as a rabbi – she became the first woman at Hebrew Union College to make it to ordination, an accomplishment she credits to her parents and to Rabbi Nelson Glueck, the college's president who died a few months before her ordination.

Her rabbinical thesis, "Historic and Changing Role of the Jewish Woman", published in 1975 under the title Judaism and the New Woman, was intended to encourage women's participation in Judaism.

It was only many years later that she learned her ordination certificate from HUC had different wording for her title than the certificates of men graduating with her. "It came as a shock to me," she noted. "When I was ordained I was told I would be getting an empty tube because they had forgotten to change the language to the feminine" on the ordination scroll. "I just accepted that. When I finally got it I thought the title, which they had changed to 'rav u'morah,' was what all my classmates got, too." In actuality, male candidates' certificates identified them by the Reform movement's traditional "morenu harav," or "our teacher the rabbi," while female candidates' certificates only used the term "rav u'morah," or "rabbi and teacher", up until 2016. After four years of deliberation, HUC decided to give women a choice of wording beginning in 2016, including the option to have the same wording as men.

== Career ==
=== Ordination ===
Priesand was ordained on June 3, 1972, by Glueck's successor as HUC-JIR's president Rabbi Alfred Gottschalk at the Plum Street Temple in Cincinnati, making her the first woman to be ordained as a rabbi in the United States and believed to be only the second woman ever to be formally ordained in the history of Judaism.

Gottschalk called the ordination of Priesand "historic", one that breaks stereotypes and allows "Jewish women to consider seeking the rabbinate" and a testament to Reform Judaism's efforts at achieving "equality of women in the congregation of the Lord". By acquiescing to women's ordination at a time of social and political changes in American life, the Reform movement portrayed itself as continuing its historic project of adapting Judaism to respond to modernity while simultaneously demonstrating its commitment to women's equality.

After her ordination, then member of Congress Bella Abzug arranged for her to deliver the opening prayer at the House of Representatives, making her the first Jewish woman to do so.

=== Rabbinical positions ===
Upon ordination, she was interviewed by some synagogues for her "public value, so they could say they were first", as she says, but others would not speak to her, and she was the last of her class to get a job. She was offered a position at Stephen Wise Free Synagogue in New York City, where she served for seven years under Rabbi Edward Klein, first as Assistant Rabbi and then as Associate Rabbi, leaving the congregation in 1979, when she realised that she would not succeed Klein as senior rabbi. Not able to find a full-time position, she served as part-time rabbi of Temple Beth El in Elizabeth, New Jersey and as Chaplain at Manhattan's Lenox Hill Hospital until 1981, when she became rabbi of Monmouth Reform Temple in Tinton Falls, New Jersey. She originally thought her "obligation was to get a bigger congregation", but rejected the traditional model which encourages rabbis to look for larger pulpits and remained at Monmouth Reform Temple, a congregation of 365 families, where she "forged a creative partnership with ... her congregation, acting upon her belief that a rabbi's primary task is to help Jews take responsibility for their Judaism".

In 1986 at Monmouth Reform Temple, she and cantor Ellen Sussman became the first all-women team of rabbi and cantor in any congregation. Also during her rabbinate, Monmouth Reform Temple created a Social Action Committee which launched a nationally recognized gun safety campaign (Please ASK, which was given an award in 2003 by the Religious Action Center of Reform Judaism), was a leader in the fight against drunk driving, created a permanent Fund for the Homeless to support the work of Interfaith Neighbors, sponsored an annual food drive for The Center in Asbury Park, continued to host an annual Monmouth County arts festival, and instituted an annual "Mitzvah Day" of charitable volunteerism.

=== Documentary appearance ===
Priesand appeared in a 2005 documentary, titled And the Gates Opened: Women in the Rabbinate, which features stories of and interviews with her, rabbi Sandy Eisenberg Sasso, and rabbi Amy Eilberg.

=== Health issues ===
In 1987, Priesand was diagnosed with breast cancer, which struck again eight years later, and in 2003, she was diagnosed with thyroid cancer. She was able to continue working during her treatments for breast cancer, but the thyroid cancer treatments forced her to take a three-month leave of absence. Her illness affected her rabbinate, making her "more sensitive and aware of the needs of others who were dealing with health crises", she said.

=== Organizational affiliations ===
Priesand has served on the board of every major institution of Reform Judaism, including the Central Conference of American Rabbis, the Union for Reform Judaism and the Hebrew Union College-Jewish Institute of Religion. She is a member of Jewish Women International, Hadassah, the National Council of Jewish Women, the National Organization for Women and the National Breast Cancer Coalition. In her local community, she is an Honorary Vice President of the Jewish Federation of Greater Monmouth County and President of Interfaith Neighbors, an organization whose primary purpose is to provide rental assistance and support services for those who are homeless. She also chairs the Clergy Advisory Committee of Planned Parenthood of Central New Jersey and serves on the board of the Holocaust, Genocide and Human Rights Education Center at Brookdale Community College, and the Jewish Heritage Museum of Monmouth County.

== Retirement and current life ==
Priesand retired from Monmouth Reform Temple on June 30, 2006, after 25 years of service to that congregation. She explained her retirement, saying: "I'm retiring by choice, because I believe that rabbis should know when to leave and when it's time to inject 'newness' into synagogue life." She intends to remain "a part of the temple family" as rabbi emerita, adding "being here has been the fulfillment of my dream to be a congregational rabbi, which is why I went to rabbinic school in the first place." Upon her retirement, Monmouth Reform Temple set up the "Sally Priesand Endowment Fund for the Future" in her honor to preserve and protect the temple's legacy.

Priesand lives in Ocean Township, New Jersey, with her Boston Terrier, Shadow. Her hobbies include photography and abstract watercolor. She had her first solo exhibition in the Backman Gallery at HUC-JIR in New York in 2002, in honor of the thirtieth anniversary of her ordination, and exhibits annually in the Monmouth Festival of the Arts.

In 2007, she invited her female rabbinic colleagues of all denominations to join her in donating their professional and personal papers to the American Jewish Archives in Cincinnati, Ohio, in order to document the history of women in the rabbinate. The first ever exhibit of the historical memorabilia of her career was displayed at the Jewish Heritage Museum of Monmouth County in the winter of 2010.

On December 6, 2010, at Temple Reyim in Newton, Massachusetts, Priesand and the other three first American ordained women rabbis of four denominations of American Judaism met for the first time in an event called "First Lights", videotaped by the Los Angeles-based Story Archive of Women Rabbis, a project which videotapes interviews with women rabbis from all streams of Judaism and archives their stories online. Priesand together with Sandy Eisenberg Sasso, the first Reconstructionist female rabbi ordained in 1974, Amy Eilberg, the first Conservative female rabbi ordained in 1985, and Sara Hurwitz (see below), lit Chanuka candles together with some 30 other women rabbis, and then spoke about their experiences.

=== 40th anniversary of ordination ===
Priesand was honored in several events on the occasion of the 40th anniversary of her ordination in 2012. In March 2012, the Annual Convention of the Central Conference of American Rabbis celebrated the 40th anniversary of women's ordination by calling Priesand to the Torah at the Monday morning prayer service; through May 2012, the Union for Reform Judaism was running a blog to celebrate "Forty Years of Women" in honor of the anniversary; and Hebrew Union College-Jewish Institute of Religion honored her as special guest at the June 2, 2012 ordination ceremony at Plum Street Temple, during which 13 candidates were ordained – eight of them women. On the day of the anniversary on June 3, 2012, Priesand, Eisenberg Sasso, Eilberg, and Hurwitz met for a "Four First Women Rabbis" discussion at Monmouth Reform Temple for a celebration honoring the four first women rabbis ordained in North America in their respective denominations, and the 40th anniversary of Priesand's ordination.

==== After her 40th ordination anniversary ====
In 2014 Priesand was one of those who attended the ceremony when a memorial plaque to Regina Jonas, the first woman to be ordained as a rabbi, was unveiled at Theresienstadt in the Czech Republic, where Regina Jonas had been deported to and worked in for two years. There is a short documentary about the trip on which this plaque was unveiled, titled In the Footsteps of Regina Jonas, which includes Priesand.

=== 50th anniversary of ordination ===
Two exhibits on the Cincinnati campus of Hebrew Union College-Jewish Institute of Religion marked the fiftieth anniversary of Priesand's ordination; Priesand herself was the keynote speaker at the opening reception for them. One of those exhibits was the art exhibit “Holy Sparks”, which featured 24 Jewish women artists, who had each created an artwork about a female rabbi who was a first in some way. Joan Roth created the artwork about Priesand. The other exhibit, called "Sally Priesand Paves the Way", featured "documents relating to Rabbi Sally J. Priesand's journey to becoming the first woman rabbi ordained in North America", and memorabilia and personal artifacts donated by Priesand.

The anniversary was also marked by a number of articles in various media outlets.

== Writings ==
Priesand is the author of Judaism and the New Woman, and a contributor to Women Rabbis: Exploration and Celebration, and to A Treasury of Favorite Sermons by Leading American Rabbis. She also wrote the foreword to the book The Sacred Calling: Four Decades of Women in the Rabbinate, published in 2016, which contains one piece called "Letters from Hebrew Union College to Sally J. Priesand" and another called "The Ordination of Sally J. Priesand, A Historic Interview".

== Awards and honors ==
In 1973, Priesand was awarded an honorary doctor of humane letters degree from Florida International University.

In 1979, the Supersisters trading card set was produced and distributed; card number 6 featured Priesand's name and picture.

From 1981 to 1983, Bonnie Tiburzi put on three “Women of Accomplishment” luncheons for the Wings Club honoring certain women, including Priesand.

In 1997, Priesand received an honorary doctor of divinity degree from Hebrew Union College-Jewish Institute of Religion (HUC-JIR). In the same year, the Rabbi Sally J. Priesand Visiting Professorship in Jewish Women's Studies was established in her honor at HUC-JIR.

In 2006, upon her retirement, Monmouth Reform Temple dedicated its sanctuary doors in her honor; they are inscribed with the following words, "פִּתְחוּ לִי שַׁעֲרֵי צֶדֶק אָבֹא בָם אוֹדֶה יָהּ Open the gates of righteousness for me that I may enter and praise God."

Also in 2006 upon her retirement, Monmouth Reform Temple set up the "Sally Priesand Endowment Fund for the Future" in her honor to preserve and protect the temple's legacy.

On April 23, 2009, she received the prestigious Elizabeth Blackwell Award given by Hobart and William Smith Colleges in Geneva, New York to women whose lives exemplify outstanding service to humanity. The award is named after Dr. Elizabeth Blackwell (1821–1910), the first woman in America to receive the Doctor of Medicine degree.

In 2010, in honor of its 125th anniversary, Good Housekeeping magazine named her one of "125 women who changed our world".

In 2023, Priesand became the first female rabbi to have her portrait featured in an exhibition at the National Portrait Gallery. That portrait was an inkjet print of a photograph from 2022 by Joan Roth.

The Rabbi Sally J. Priesand WRJ Award was created to honor the 45th anniversary of Priesand's ordination. The award is given out once every year to a graduating Hebrew Union College-Jewish Institute of Religion Cincinnati campus woman, chosen because she "exemplif[ies] the mission and values of WRJ and embod[ies] the qualities that Rabbi Priesand has exhibited throughout her career, including her clarity of vision, her commitment to excellence, her professionalism, her dedication to the continuity of Reform Judaism, her passion, and her perseverance.

The poem “Let my people go that we may serve You”, by Merle Feld, was commissioned by the Women's Rabbinic Network in honor of Priesand.

== See also ==
- List of Reform rabbis
- Paula Herskovitz Ackerman
- Timeline of women rabbis
