= Temple Beth-El (Pensacola, Florida) =

Reform Jewish synagogue in Pensacola, Florida, US

- Hebrew: ק.ק. בית אל
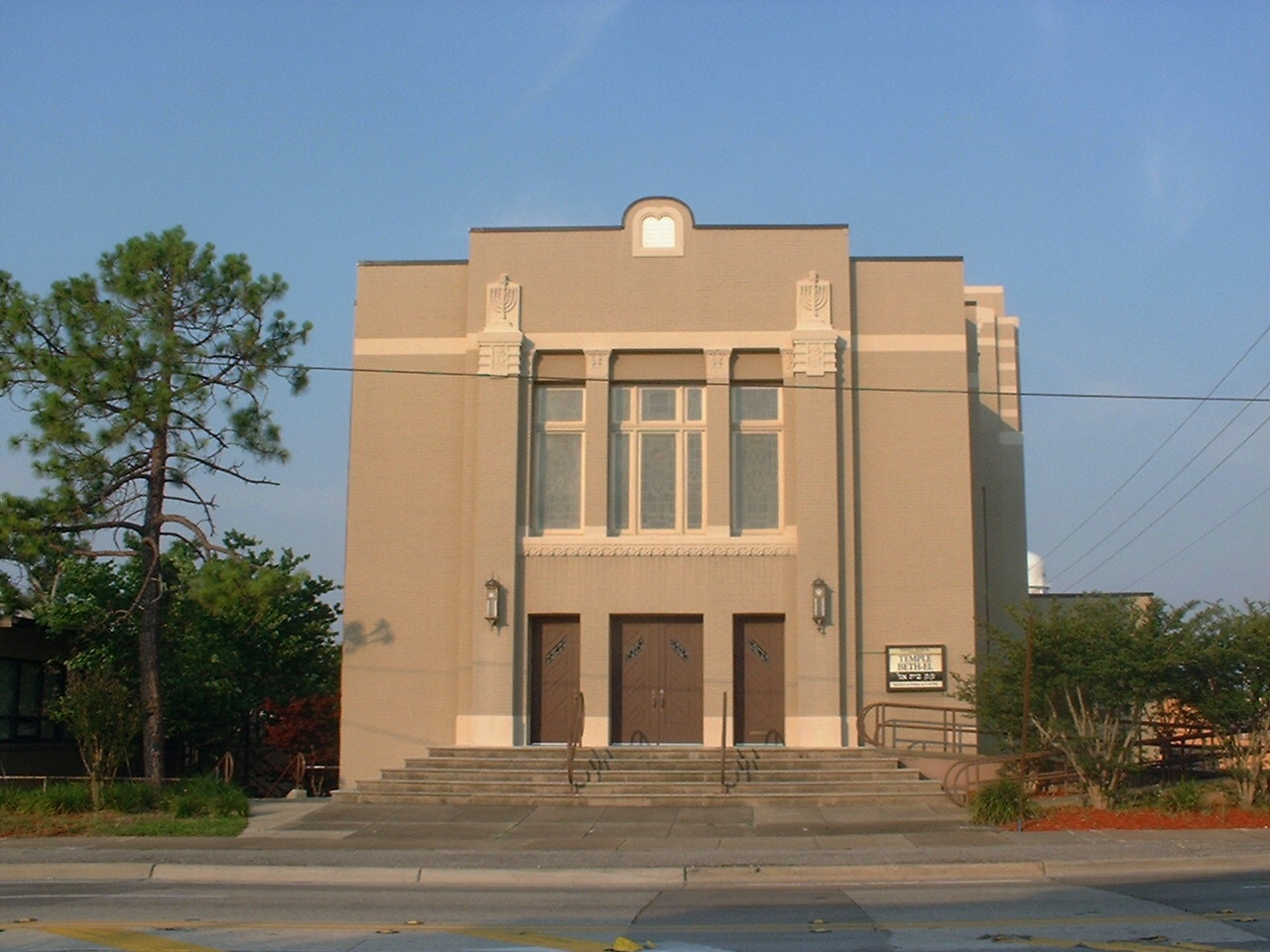
- Temple Beth-El, in 2005

- Location in Florida

Religion
- Affiliation: Reform Judaism
- Ecclesiastical or organizational status: Synagogue
- Leadership: Rabbi Joel Fleekop
- Status: Active

Location
- Location: 800 North Palafox Street, Pensacola, Florida 32501
- Country: United States
- Interactive map of Temple Beth-El
- Coordinates: 30°25′18″N 87°13′01″W

Architecture
- Type: Synagogue
- Style: Art Deco
- Established: 1876 (as a congregation)
- Completed: c. 1880s; 1912 (E. Chase Street); 1933 (N. Palafox Street)

Website
- templebethelofpensacola.org

Temple Beth-El (Hebrew: ק.ק. בית אל) is a Reform Jewish congregation and synagogue, located at 800 North Palafox Street, in downtown Pensacola, Florida, in the United States. Founded in 1876, it is the oldest Jewish congregation in Florida.

Beth-El is a member of the Union for Reform Judaism, and has led the congregation in Reform services since the temple's foundation. The current rabbi, since July 2021, is Joel Fleekop.

== History ==
The first Jews who migrated to northwest Florida originally stopped at Milton, 20 miles (32 km) to the east, because Milton was a national hub for lumber production and distribution in the South (the first Jews to the area were skilled in lumber production; they came from heavily wooded areas in what is now southern Germany).

Sensing more business opportunities to the west, a congregation settled in Pensacola and founded a Reform temple after forming in 1876. Many of the lumber workers in Milton did not follow the congregation, and eventually started a smaller Jewish community in Okaloosa County when lumber opportunities dried up. The male members of Beth-El's first congregation consisted largely of businessmen and tavern owners.

The first two buildings of Temple Beth-El were destroyed in fires, first in 1895 and again in 1929.

In 1933 Temple Beth-El moved into its third and current building, designed in the Art Deco style.

Today, many members of the current congregation are descendants of the men who founded the temple over 125 years ago. Immigrants from Eastern Europe, Israel, and the Caucasus eventually settled in Pensacola and became part of the congregation as well. Beth-El is unique today in that a large number of the congregation consists of Jews who converted from other faiths.

Starting in 1962, Paula Ackerman, a member of the congregation since birth, was the first woman to perform rabbinical functions in the United States. From 1962 until a suitable replacement was found in 1963, Ackerman served the congregation at Beth-El as an acting rabbi.

== Notable members ==
- Paula Ackerman (1893–1989), both as a child and later serving the congregation as a rabbi.

== Gallery ==
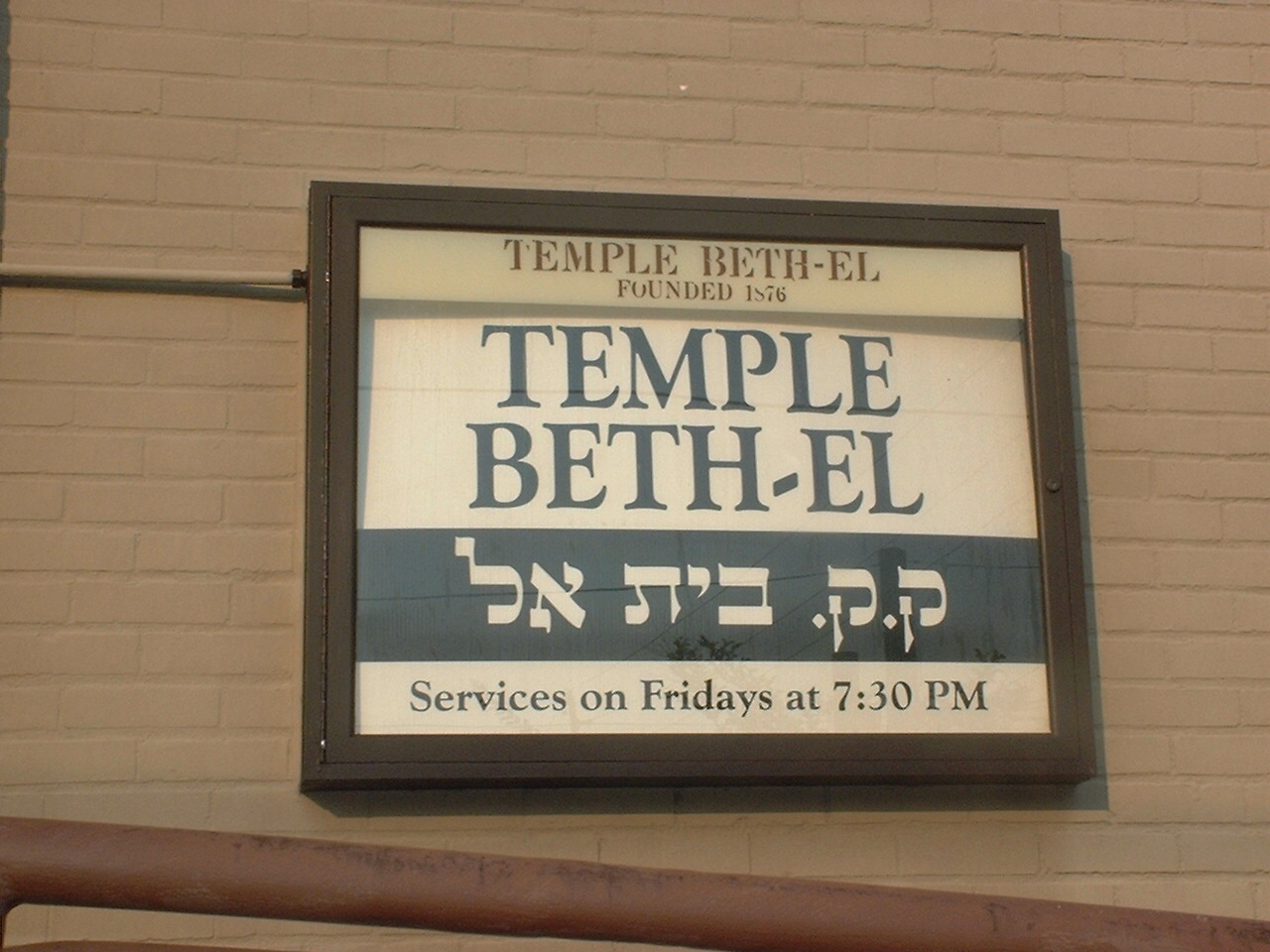
The Temple's placard, with the name in Hebrew script below.

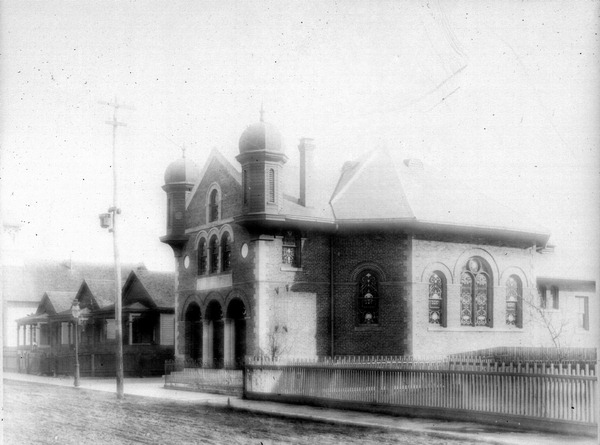
1912 temple at 37 East Chase Street.

== See also ==
- History of the Jews in South Florida
- List of the oldest synagogues in the United States
