= Abraham Geiger College =

German rabbinic seminary

Coordinates: 52.402°N 13.011°E

The Abraham Geiger Kolleg (AGK) in Potsdam, founded in 1999, is a rabbinical seminary, an affiliated institute of the University of Potsdam in the Federal Republic of Germany and the first such new institution in continental Europe since the Shoah. It is named after Abraham Geiger (1810 – 1874), an important representative of liberal Judaism in Germany, and was established by Dr. Jan Mühlstein (then chairman of the Union of Progressive Jews in Germany) and Rabbi Walter Jacob z‘‘L. Since 2008, it has also trained cantors.

== History ==
The Abraham Geiger Kolleg was founded by Dr. Jan Mühlstein and Rabbi Prof. Walter Jacob z‘‘L in 1999 in Potsdam. Teaching began in October 2001. The first rector was Rabbi Allen Howard Podet. He was followed by Rabbi Walter Homolka, who served from 2002 to 2023.

The AGK has been a member of the World Union for Progressive Judaism since 2001. Its graduates have been accredited by the Central Conference of American Rabbis (CCAR) since 2005.

The ordination of the first class took place on 14 September 2006 in Dresden: Daniel Alter, Tomáš Kučera and Malcolm Mattitiani were ordained as rabbis. This was the first ordination in Germany since 1942, when the Hochschule für die Wissenschaft des Judentums (College for the Science of Judaism) in Berlin was closed by the Gestapo.

In 2007, the college was honoured as a ‘Place in the Land of Ideas’, a location initiative under the patronage of former Federal President Horst Köhler. In 2009, the cantorial training programme received the same distinction.

In 2010, Alina Treiger became the first woman in Germany to be ordained as a rabbi after Regina Jonas.

Walter Homolka was the rector of the college until April 2023. Since then, Rabbi Andreas Nachama has been the rabbinic principal and Milena Rosenzweig-Winter has been the managing director.

== Sponsorship ==
The Abraham Geiger College (AGK) was founded in 1999 as a registered non-profit organisation. In 2002, it became a non-profit limited liability company (gGmbH). The shares were initially held by the American Friends for Progressive Judaism in Germany with Rabbi Walter Jacob and the Leo Baeck Foundation, which is headed by Rabbi Walter Homolka. Later, the shares were transferred in full to the Leo Baeck Foundation. In January 2023, the sponsorship of the Abraham Geiger Kolleg was transferred from the Leo Baeck Foundation to the Jewish Community of Berlin.

The AGK is funded by the Federal Republic of Germany, the Standing Conference of Ministers of Education and Cultural Affairs of all German federal states and the state of Brandenburg.

== Training ==
The AGK is an affiliated institute of the University of Potsdam. The five-year training programme is conducted in collaboration with the School of Jewish Theology and concludes with a Master's degree for rabbinical students and a Bachelor for cantorial students.

== Controversy ==
In May 2022, the German daily newspaper Die Welt published articles about incidents of sexual harassment at the college. The press accused the director, Walter Homolka, of covering up the allegations. However, the accused employee had been reprimanded in February 2021 and left the College in February 2022. State investigation had been dropped due to insignificance.

Homolka took a leave of absence in May 2022 and ended his contract in April 2023. There was no evidence of disciplinary or criminal matters.

In 2022, under the direction of an interim director, the College presented drafts for a reorganisation and has been in the process of coordinating with all public sponsors.

Students have decided to continue their studies with the AGK.
