= Rabbinate =

Rabbinate (Hebrew: רַבָּנוּת) may refer to:

- Most often, the office or function of a rabbi
- Chief Rabbinate of Israel, the supreme Jewish religious governing body in the state of Israel
- Military Rabbinate, an Israel Defense Forces unit that provides religious services to soldiers, including non-Jews

== See also ==
- Rabbinic Judaism
- Sanhedrin
