= Max Dienemann =

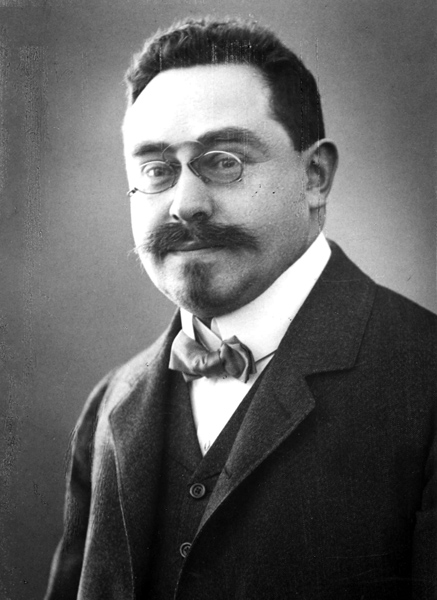

Personal life
- Born: 27 September 1875 Krotoschin, Kingdom of Prussia
- Died: 10 April 1939 (aged 63) Tel Aviv, Mandatory Palestine
- Spouse: Mally Dienemann
- Children: Dora Dienemann; Paula Dienemann; Gabriele Dienemann
- Parent(s): Izshah Dienemann (b. 1845); Hanne Dembitzer
- Occupation: Rabbi

Religious life
- Religion: Judaism

Max Dienemann (27 September 1875 – 10 April 1939) was a German reform rabbi, publicist and philologist. He was one of the leading Liberal rabbis in Germany. Together with Leo Baeck, he headed the Rabbinical Association of Germany, in which liberal and orthodox rabbis were organized. In 1935, he ordained Regina Jonas, the first female rabbi in Jewish history.

== Life ==
Max Dienemann was born in September 1875 in Krotoschin in the Prussian province of Posen. Dienemann first attended a Jewish folk school and a high school. He then studied Oriental philology in Breslau and graduated in 1898. In the following decades, Dienemann's works were published in Jewish newspapers, as he published sermons and Liberal interpretations of the Torah. His lectures, held throughout Germany, testified to his more traditional attitude towards Judaism. He warned against nationalism and racism and pleaded for Zionism. From 1903 to 1919 he was a rabbi in Ratibor in Upper Silesia. In 1919, he was appointed rabbi by the Israelite community in Offenbach am Main and acted until 1938.

Dienemann promoted the unity and independence of the Jews in Germany, but at the same time he also understood himself as a "German patriot". In 1935, Dienemann ordained Regina Jonas, the first female rabbi in the history of Judaism.

During the National Socialist era, Dienemann was interned twice in concentration camps. First interned in a camp in Osthofen in 1933, he was later imprisoned in Buchenwald in 1938. Together with his family, he was forced to emigrate after Kristallnacht. In March 1939, the Dienemann family moved to Palestine. Dienemann died less than a month later in Tel Aviv.

Today, Dienemann is remembered by a path commemorated to him in Offenbach am Main's Büsing-Park. His path intersects one dedicated to Regina Jonas. An organization stationed in Offenbach called the Max Dienemann / Salomon Formstecher Society draws their name from Dienemann and his predecessor Salomon Formstecher.

== Works ==
- Judaism and Christianity, 1914
- Liberal Judaism, Schocken, Berlin 1935
- Galuth, 1939
- Central Association of German Citizens of Jewish Faith, 1931–1933

== Literature ==
- Mally Dienemann: Max Dienemann. A memorial book. 1875–1939. Latimer, Trend & Co, Plymouth, England 1946
- Frank Surall: Between dogmatism and rejudaization. The (undefined) perception of Protestantism by Max Dienemann. In: Görge K. Hasselhoff (eds.), The Discovery of Christianity in the Science of Judaism, Berlin; New York, 2010, pp. 279–300
- Frank Surall (2010). "Max Dienemann". In Bautz, Traugott (ed.). Biographisch-Bibliographisches Kirchenlexikon (BBKL) (in German). Vol. 31. Nordhausen: Bautz. ISBN 978-3-88309-544-8.
