= Alina Treiger =

German rabbi

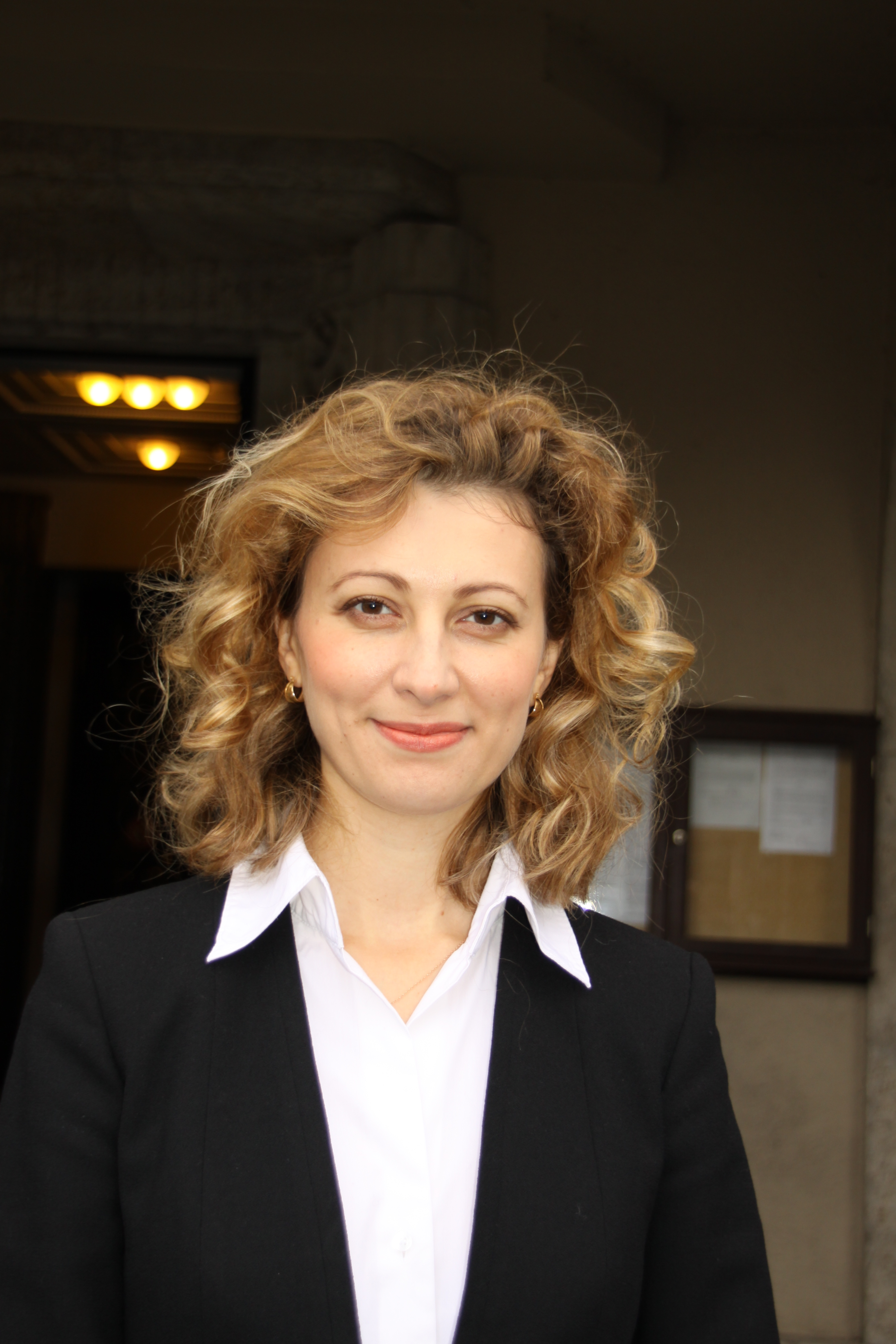
Rabbi Alina Treiger

Alina Treiger (born March 8, 1979, Poltava, Ukraine) is the first female rabbi to be ordained in Germany since World War II.

== Biography ==
Treiger was born in Poltava, Ukraine and grew up in the Jewish community there. Her father is Jewish, wasn't able to attend college and worked in a factory. Her mother, a trained food technician, was active in the local Jewish congregation but did not become a member until 2013. Treiger, who identified as a religious Jew from a young age, joined the local congregation in her teens. She took part in youth programming and summer camps and eventually traveled to Israel with the Jewish Agency in 1998. Following the collapse of the Soviet Union, Treiger started a Jewish youth club in Poltava and then traveled to Moscow to study at the World Union for Progressive Judaism. As a 21-year old, after finishing her studies, she founded Beit Am, a liberal congregation in her hometown. She emigrated to Germany in 2001. In 2002, through the WUPJ, Treiger enrolled at the Abraham Geiger College of the University of Potsdam for her rabbinical studies. Her ordination was held at Berlin's Pestalozzistrasse Synagogue, and attended by Christian Wulff, then president of Germany, and Jewish leaders from around the world. Among Treiger's inspirations was Regina Jonas, Germany's first female rabbi, who was ordained in 1935. Treiger moved to Germany because she felt stifled by the Orthodox Jewish community in Ukraine. Germany has needed more rabbis in order to handle the influx of Soviet Jews who have emigrated to Germany since the dissolution of the Soviet Union. She worked primarily with the Russian-speaking Jewish immigrants in the city of Oldenburg and the nearby town of Delmenhorst until September 2024, when she became the rabbi of the liberal community in Hamburg.

== See also ==
- Timeline of women rabbis
