= The Jacob Rader Marcus Center of the American Jewish Archives =

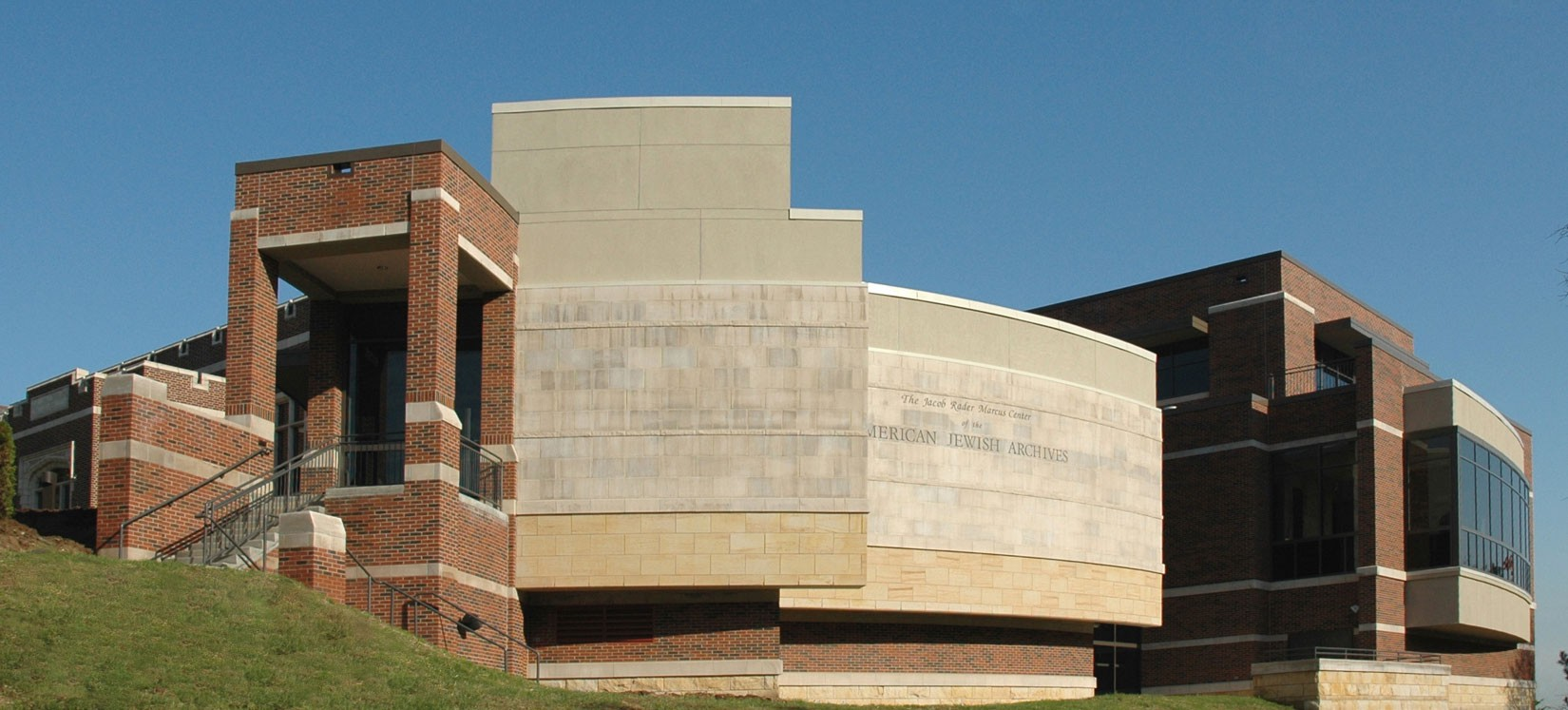
The Jacob Rader Marcus Center of the American Jewish Archives

The Jacob Rader Marcus Center of the American Jewish Archives, founded in 1947, is committed to preserving a documentary heritage of the religious, organizational, economic, cultural, personal, social and family life of American Jewry. It has become the largest free-standing research center dedicated solely to the study of the American Jewish experience. It is located in Cincinnati, Ohio.

== History ==
The American Jewish Archives (AJA) was founded by Dr. Jacob Rader Marcus (1896-1995), former graduate and professor at the Hebrew Union College, in the aftermath of World War II and the Holocaust. For over a half century, the American Jewish Archives has been preserving American Jewish history and imparting it to the next generation. Dr. Marcus directed the American Jewish Archives for forty-eight years until his death at which time the AJA’s name became The Jacob Rader Marcus Center of the American Jewish Archives. Dr. Gary P. Zola, one of Marcus’s students, became the second Executive Director on 1 July 1998.

== Collections ==
The Jacob Rader Marcus Center of the American Jewish Archives is a semi-autonomous division of the Hebrew Union College-Jewish Institute of Religion. Located on HUC-JIR’s Cincinnati campus, the AJA houses over ten million pages of documentation. It contains nearly 8,000 feet (2,400 m) of archives, manuscripts, nearprint materials, photographs, audio and video tapes, microfilm, and genealogical materials. Its four core areas of collecting interest are those records of American Jewish personalities and institutions that possess historical significance; the records of American Reform Judaism; the records of American Jewish communities with a special focus on the Jews of Cincinnati; and the records of the Hebrew Union College-Jewish Institute of Religion.

== Publications ==
The Marcus Center also publishes a semi-annual publication, The American Jewish Archives Journal (AJAJ). It documents and preserves the American Jewish experience through the publication of scholarly articles and primary documents written by academic and independent historians from around the world. Furthermore, it contains important news from the AJA and book reviews of relevant secondary literature. The AJAJ is considered one of the two major refereed periodicals that examine the entire scope of American Jewish history. Issues of the AJAJ are available online through the AJA website.

== Fellowship Program ==
In 1977, The Marcus Center founded its Fellowship Program which serves to bring scholars to Cincinnati in order to make use of the AJA’s unique collection as well as to present their work to the larger community. Today the Marcus Center administers twelve endowed fellowships and it is its hope that this program advances our understanding of both American Jewish history and of our nation as a whole.

== Website ==
The Jacob Rader Marcus Center of the American Jewish Archives is continually expanding its electronic and print publications. Its website features media-rich, interactive, online exhibits including 350 Years of American Jewry, Great Voices of Reform Judaism, and Hebrew Union College: 125 Years. As well, it posts educational resources, audio and visual programs, and links to other institutional collections.
