= Amy Eilberg =

American rabbi (born 1954)

- Title: Rabbi

Personal life
- Born: October 12, 1954 (age 71) Philadelphia, Pennsylvania, U.S.
- Spouse: Howard Eilberg-Schwartz (m. 1977; div. 1992); Louis E. Newman (m. 1996)
- Parents: Joshua Eilberg (father); Gladys Eilberg (mother)

Religious life
- Religion: Judaism
- Denomination: Conservative

Amy Eilberg (born October 12, 1954) is the first female rabbi ordained in Conservative Judaism. She was ordained in 1985 by the Jewish Theological Seminary of America, one of the academic centers and spiritual centers of Conservative Judaism.

== Youth and early life ==
Eilberg was born October 12, 1954, in Philadelphia, Pennsylvania. Her father, Joshua Eilberg, represented Pennsylvania in the U.S. House of Representatives, and her mother, Gladys, was a social worker. Her parents were proud but not observant Jews, but when Eilberg was fourteen, her newfound commitment to traditional Jewish observance led her mother to make their home kitchen conform to the Jewish dietary laws kashrut. In high school, she was involved in the United Synagogue Youth and she later worked at Camp Ramah in the Poconos, in New England, and in Wisconsin.

Eilberg attended Brandeis University from 1972 to 1976, continuing to develop her deep interest in Judaism. She majored in Near Eastern and Judaic Studies, and also became an active member of Hillel International on campus. While at Brandeis she learned how to read the Torah and began to pray with tallit and tephillin. In 1976 she graduated from Brandeis and enrolled in Jewish Theological Seminary (JTS) to do graduate work in Talmud. After receiving her master's degree, she taught at Midreshet Yerushalayim, an intensive egalitarian yeshiva program run by the JTS in Israel. When she found out that JTS had tabled the question of women's ordination in 1979, she was disappointed but she began to pursue doctoral studies in Talmud, first at Neve Schechter, the JTS branch in Jerusalem, and then at JTS in New York City. She later enrolled in the Smith College School for Social Work and in 1984 received her masters of social work.

== Rabbinical school ==
Eilberg was among the first group of women who immediately signed up for classes in the Jewish Theological Seminary rabbinical school in the fall of 1984. Since the early 1970s, leaders of the Jewish Theological Seminary (JTS) had engaged in serious discussions and debates about women's ordination in Conservative Judaism. Hastened by the Reform movement's decision to ordain Sally Priesand in 1972 and the Reconstructionist movement to ordain Sandy Eisenberg Sasso in 1974, members of the Rabbinical Assembly, the central organization of Conservative rabbis, initiated exploratory studies about Jewish legal attitudes toward women's ordination. (Note: Gerson Cohen, chancellor of JTS from 1972 to 1986, became an active proponent of the admission of women into rabbinical programs after reviewing the conclusions of a national study conducted in the late 1970s. In October 1983, shortly after the death of Rabbi Saul Lieberman, who had been a powerful force against women's ordination, the faculty of JTS voted to allow women to enter their rabbinical school. (See Nadell, Pamela S., "Women Who Would Be Rabbis: A History of Women's Ordination, 1889–1985" in Jewish Women's Life.)) As of 2014, the seminaries of the Conservative Movement have ordained approximately 300 women rabbis.

== Rabbinic life ==
On May 12, 1985, at the age of thirty, Eilberg became the first woman ordained in Conservative Judaism, and later that same year she became the first female member of the Rabbinical Assembly. In 1986 she became the first woman appointed to serve on the Rabbinical Assembly's Committee on Jewish Law and Standards. She started her career as a chaplain at Methodist Hospital in Indianapolis. She served for one year as the assistant rabbi at Har Zion Temple near Philadelphia. In 1989, she stepped down from that position at this synagogue, explaining in her resignation letter that her desire to spend more time with her young daughter was one of the primary motivations for her decision. She also realized that her true passion was for caring for the ill. She served as hospice chaplain for the Jewish Hospice Program in Philadelphia, then she helped found the Bay Area Jewish Healing Center in San Francisco where she directed the program's Jewish Hospice Care Program. At the height of the AIDS crisis, the Jewish Healing Center offered spiritual care to Jews people living with illness, death, and loss.

Eilberg appeared in a 2005 documentary, titled And the Gates Opened: Women in the Rabbinate, which features stories of and interviews with her, rabbi Sally Priesand, and rabbi Sandy Eisenberg Sasso.

On December 6, 2010, at Temple Reyim in Newton, MA, Amy Eilberg met for the first time with Sally Priesand, the first Reform female rabbi, Sandy Eisenberg Sasso, the first Reconstructionist female rabbi, and Sara Hurwitz, considered by some to be the first Orthodox female rabbi. They and approximately 30 other women rabbis lit Chanukah candles and then spoke about their experiences in an open forum.

On June 3, 2012, Priesand, Sasso, Eilberg, and Hurwitz met again, this time at Monmouth Reform Temple at a celebration honoring the four first women rabbis to be ordained in their respective denominations, and the 40th anniversary of Priesand's ordination.

The 2022 art exhibit “Holy Sparks”, shown among other places at the Dr. Bernard Heller Museum, featured art about twenty-four female rabbis who were firsts in some way; Pat Berger created the artwork about Eilberg that was in that exhibit.

== Personal life ==
Eilberg has been married twice, first to Howard Eilberg-Schwartz, and then, in 1996, to Louis E. Newman, a professor of Judaic Studies at Carleton College. She has one daughter, Penina, from her first marriage, and two stepsons, Etan and Jonah, from her second. She lived in Mendota Heights, Minnesota, and was a regular member of Beth Jacob Congregation in Mendota Heights. She currently lives in San Francisco.

== Writings ==
- Eilberg, Amy (1987). "Kol Isha: A New Voice in Conservative Judaism.". In Cardin, Nina Beth; Silverman, David Wolf (eds.). The Seminary at 100.
- Eilberg, Amy (1994). "I Must Keep Singing: Psalm 137". In Weintraub, Simkha (ed.). Healing of Spirit, Healing of Body.
- Eilberg, Amy (2001). "Walking in the Valley of the Shadow: Caring for the Dying and Their Loved Ones". In Friedman, Dayle (ed.). Jewish Pastoral Care.
- Eilberg, Amy (2004). "A Grieving Ritual Following Miscarriage". In Orenstein, Debra (ed.). Lifecycles: Jewish Women on Life Passages and Personal Milestones.
- Eilberg, Amy (2014). From Enemy to Friend: Jewish Wisdom and the Pursuit of Peace. Orbis.

== See also ==
- Timeline of women rabbis
