= List of NBA team owners =

This article is a list of principal owners of National Basketball Association teams.

The NBA requires a change in "controlling ownership" to be approved by the NBA Board of Governors, composed of one representative (Governor) from each team. Toronto Raptors owner Larry Tanenbaum has been Chairman of the NBA Board of Governors since 2017.

Franchise	Owner(s)	Governor	Operating entity	Enterprise Valuation (USD)	Year became principal owner(s)
Atlanta Hawks	Majority owner Tony Ressler (50%); Minority owners Grant Hill, Steven Price, Rick Schnall, Sara Blakely, Jesse Itzler, Ted Virtue, Bob Goodman; Blue Owl Capital (6%); Michael Gearon, Jr. and Rutherford Seydel (1% combined)	Tony Ressler	Hawks Basketball, Inc.	$5.000 billion	2015
Boston Celtics	Majority owner William Chisholm (51%); Minority owners Wyc Grousbeck (49%), Aditya Mittal, Bruce Beal, Andrew Bialecki, Dom Ferrante, Rob Hale, Mario Ho, Ian Loring, and Sixth Street	William Chisholm	Boston Basketball Partners	$6.700 billion	2025
Brooklyn Nets	Majority owners Joe and Clara Wu Tsai (85%); Minority owners Julia, David Jr., Mary Julia, and John Koch (15%)	Joe Tsai	BSE Global	$5.600 billion	2019
Charlotte Hornets	Majority owners Gabe Plotkin, Rick Schnall; Minority owners Michael Jordan, J. Cole, Eric Church, Chris Shumway, Dan Sundheim, Ian Loring, Andrew Schwartzberg, Dyal HomeCourt Partners, Amy Levine Dawson, and Damian Mills	Rick Schnall (rotates with Plotkin every 5 years)	Hornets Sports & Entertainment	$3.800 billion	2023
Chicago Bulls	Majority owner Jerry Reinsdorf (63%); Minority owners Lester Crown and Lamar Hunt's estate	Jerry Reinsdorf	Chicago Professional Sports Limited Partnership	$6.000 billion	1985
Cleveland Cavaliers	Dan Gilbert		Cavaliers Entertainment LLC	$4.800 billion	2005
Dallas Mavericks	Miriam Adelson, Sivan Ochshorn, and Patrick Dumont (69%), Mark Cuban (27%), Mary Stanton (4%)	Patrick Dumont	Dallas Basketball Limited	$5.100 billion	2023
Denver Nuggets	Ann Walton Kroenke		Kroenke Sports & Entertainment, Denver Nuggets Limited Partnership	$4.600 billion	2000
Detroit Pistons	Tom Gores		Palace Sports & Entertainment, Detroit Pistons Basketball Company	$3.650 billion	2011
Golden State Warriors	Joe Lacob (25%), Peter Guber, Arctos Partners (13%)	Joe Lacob	GSW Sports LLC	$11.000 billion	2010
Houston Rockets	Tilman Fertitta		Fertitta Entertainment	$5.900 billion	2017
Indiana Pacers	Herbert Simon (80%), Steven Rales (20%)		Pacers Sports & Entertainment, Pacers Basketball, LLC	$4.200 billion	1983
Los Angeles Clippers	Steve Ballmer (99%) Dennis J. Wong (1%)	John Gibson (interim) (Note: John Gibson is serving as the team's governor and chief executive officer on an interim basis, having assumed the role in September 2026 after Steve Ballmer was suspended for one year over his role in the team's salary cap scandal.)	LAC Basketball Club, Inc.	$7.500 billion	2014
Los Angeles Lakers	Majority owner Mark Walter; Minority owners Jerry Buss Family Trusts (15%), Todd Boehly, Edward P. Roski, and Patrick Soon-Shiong	Jeanie Buss	The Los Angeles Lakers, Inc.	$10.000 billion	2025
Memphis Grizzlies	Robert J. Pera		Memphis Basketball LLC	$3.500 billion	2012
Miami Heat	Micky Arison (88%); Julio Iglesias, Raanan Katz, Robert Sturges, and Amancio Suarez (12%)	Micky Arison	Miami Heat Limited Partnership	$3.600 billion	1995
Milwaukee Bucks	Wesley Edens, Jimmy and Dee Haslam (25%)		Milwaukee Bucks, Inc.	$4.300 billion	2014
Minnesota Timberwolves	Alex Rodriguez and Marc Lore		Minnesota Timberwolves Basketball Limited Partnership	$3.600 billion	2025
New Orleans Pelicans	Gayle Benson		New Orleans Pelicans NBA Limited Partnership	$3.550 billion	2012
New York Knicks	James Dolan		The Madison Square Garden Company, New York Knicks, Inc.	$9.750 billion	1997
Oklahoma City Thunder	Clay Bennett		Professional Basketball Club LLC	$4.350 billion	2006
Orlando Magic	Dan DeVos		RDV Sports, Inc., Orlando Magic, Ltd.	$3.900 billion	1991
Philadelphia 76ers	Josh Harris and David Blitzer		Harris Blitzer Sports & Entertainment	$5.450 billion	2011
Phoenix Suns	Mat Ishbia and Justin Ishbia (57%), four minority shareholders, including Jahm Najafi	Mat Ishbia (alternate: Justin Ishbia)	Unknown	$5.425 billion	2023
Portland Trail Blazers	Tom Dundon		TBD	$4.250 billion	2026
Sacramento Kings	Vivek Ranadivé, Paul E. Jacobs, Gary E. Jacobs, Hal Jacobs, Jeffrey A. Jacobs,		Sacramento Kings Partnership Group (operating entity yet to be named)	$4.450 billion	2013
San Antonio Spurs	Peter J. Holt		Spurs Sports & Entertainment, San Antonio Spurs LLC	$4.400 billion	1993
Toronto Raptors	Rogers Communications (75%), Larry Tanenbaum (25%)	Larry Tanenbaum	Maple Leaf Sports & Entertainment, Toronto Raptors Basketball Club	$5.400 billion	1998
Utah Jazz	80%: Ryan Smith, Ashley Smith, Ryan Sweeney, Mike Cannon-Brookes; <20%: Miller Family; >1% Dwyane Wade	Ryan Smith	Jazz Basketball Investors, Inc.	$4.100 billion	2021
Washington Wizards	Ted Leonsis	Ted Leonsis	Monumental Sports & Entertainment	$4.700 billion	2010

== See also ==
- Forbes list of the most valuable NBA clubs
- List of current NBA head coaches
- List of NBA team presidents
- List of NBA general managers
- List of NHL franchise owners
- List of NFL franchise owners
- List of Major League Baseball principal owners
- List of MLS team owners
- List of professional sports teams in the United States and Canada
