= Atlanta Hawks, LLC =

Sports team ownership group

- Type: Private
- Industry: Sports, property management
- Founded: 2004
- Defunct: 2015
- Headquarters: Atlanta, Georgia
- Products: Professional sports teams, arenas
- Owner: Seven businessmen (Majority Owner: Bruce Levenson & Michael Gearon Jr.)
- Subsidiaries: Atlanta Thrashers (2004–2011); Atlanta Hawks (2004–2015)

Atlanta Hawks, LLC (formerly known as Atlanta Spirit LLC) was an Atlanta, Georgia-based parent company formerly the holder of the franchise of the Atlanta Hawks, a professional basketball team in the NBA, and the Atlanta Thrashers, a former professional hockey team in the NHL. The Atlanta Spirit LLC name was changed to Atlanta Hawks, LLC on March 14, 2014.

== Overview ==
Atlanta Spirit LLC was originally composed of three companies: a Boston-based company (run by Steve Belkin), an Atlanta-based company (composed of J. Rutherford Seydel, Todd Foreman, J. Michael Gearon Sr., Beau Turner and Bud Seretean) and a Washington, D.C.-based company (composed of Bruce Levenson, Ed Peskowitz and Todd Foreman). The Boston-based company was bought out by the Atlanta and Washington, D.C. groups in 2010 following conflicts between the three groups.

Bud Seretean died in 2007. In 2014, Levenson announced he would sell his share of the company; however, by January 2015, every partner in the ownership group agreed to sell their stakes in the team, putting the entire franchise up for sale.

== History ==
In 2004, Atlanta Spirit LLC bought the Atlanta Thrashers, Atlanta Hawks, and operating rights to Philips Arena from Time Warner's Turner Broadcasting System.

In the summer of 2005, the Atlanta Hawks finalized a trade with the Phoenix Suns to obtain shooting guard Joe Johnson for Boris Diaw and two protected future first-round picks. While this trade met with the approval of the majority of the ownership group, it was rejected by Belkin, who held a controlling vote as the Hawks Governor within the group. This triggered legal proceedings to force Belkin out of the group. On December 23, 2010, the group led by Gearon and Levenson announced they had bought out Belkin's ownership share in Atlanta Spirit LLC. This elevated the Washington-based company shares to more than 50 percent and effective control of the group.

In 2007, Spirit co-founder Bud Seretean died at the age of 83.

On May 31, 2011, the Atlanta Spirit LLC sold the Thrashers to True North Sports and Entertainment, who relocated the team to Winnipeg, Manitoba, and re-branded them as the new Winnipeg Jets.

On September 7, 2014, the company's majority owner Bruce Levenson announced he would sell his interest in the company. Levenson explained the reason was a racially insensitive e-mail he sent to Hawks general manager Danny Ferry in 2012, saying that the team's low ticket sales were due to the Hawks attracting an African American fanbase that alienated the white suburbanites. He opted to share the e-mail with the NBA in July 2014, during the lawsuits that led the league to take the Los Angeles Clippers from Donald Sterling, as the emergence of such a discrimination-related debacle made Levenson "remorseful for using those hurtful words". On January 2, 2015, the Atlanta Journal-Constitution reported that all partners in the ownership group would join Levenson and sell their minority stakes, effectively putting the entire franchise up for sale. Goldman Sachs and Inner Circle Sports LLC handled the sale of the team, the operating rights to Philips Arena, and the remaining debt on the arena. Per NBA Commissioner Adam Silver, the Hawks are expected to remain in Atlanta as a condition of their sale. On April 22, 2015, Atlanta Hawks, LLC reached a tentative agreement to sell the team and arena operating rights to a group led by Tony Ressler for $850 million. The sale of the team was approved by the NBA Board of Governors on June 24, 2015.

== Turner connection ==
Although Ted Turner is not a part of this group, there are many connections to him: Beau Turner is his youngest son, J. Rutherford Seydel is his son-in-law, Michael Gearon Sr. was the general manager (1977–79), president (1977–1986) and chairman of the board (1986–2004) of the Atlanta Hawks while Turner was their owner, and Seretean was also a former president and general manager of the Hawks (1975–77) and a former board member of Turner Broadcasting System.
