= Steven Price (businessman) =

American businessman (born 1962)

- Born: 1962 (age 62–63)
- Education: B.S. Brown University; J.D. Columbia University School of Law
- Occupation(s): Executive Chairman, Townsquare Media
- Known for: Co-founder of 25madison, Co-founder of Townsquare Media; Minority owner of the Atlanta Hawks.
- Spouse: Tina Gitlin
- Parent(s): Margery and Robert Price

Steven Price (born 1962) is an American businessman serving as executive chairman of Townsquare Media, and minority owner of the Atlanta Hawks.

== Biography ==
Price was born to a Jewish family, the son of Margery and Robert Price. His father was the president of the Price Communications Corporation, a publishing and broadcasting company based in New York City. Price graduated from Brown University Phi Beta Kappa, magna cum laude and then attended Columbia University School of Law. After school, he practiced law at Davis Polk & Wardwell, worked as an investment banker at Goldman Sachs, served as deputy assistant Secretary of Defense, and worked at two private equity firms before co-founding Townsquare Media and 25madison. Townsquare Media owns and operates 360 radio stations in small to mid-sized markets throughout the USA. In 2014, he bought a stake in the Atlanta Hawks from Bruce Levenson. He maintained his share after the team was purchased by a group in 2015 led by Tony Ressler along with Grant Hill, Sarah Blakely, Jesse Itzler, and Rick Schnall for $850 million.

== Philanthropy ==
Price directs his charitable activities through the Tina & Steven Price Charitable Foundation. The fund is active in the New York area Jewish community and has provided funding for the Metropolitan Council on Jewish Poverty, the American Enterprise Institute, Commentary Magazine, the Jewish Theological Seminary, and the Council on Foreign Relations. Price serves on the boards of the UJA Federation and Hillel International.

== Personal life ==
In 1991, he married Tina Gitlin in a Jewish ceremony at the Park Avenue Synagogue.
