= M. B. "Bud" Seretean =

American businessman

M. B. "Bud" Seretean (May 13, 1924 – August 13, 2007) was an American businessman and author. Seretean was also the president and general manager of the Atlanta Hawks NBA team from 1975 to 1977.

== Early life ==
Seretean was born Martin Bud Seretean on May 13, 1924, in New York City. After serving as a field artillery officer in World War II, he received a degree in business marketing from Oklahoma State University (OSU) in 1949 and afterwards attended graduate school at New York University.

== Business career ==
He founded Coronet Industries, a carpet manufacturing company in the state of Georgia, in 1956. With two partners, he invested $45,000 in a one-machine facility; by 1965, the company had 17 machines and sales of more than $25 million a year. In 1965 he was named the Outstanding Small Businessman in the nation. In 1971, Seretean was the recipient of the Gold Torch Award from City of Hope, a pilot medical center headquartered in Duarte, California. That year, he sold Coronet to RCA for $168 million and became one of its directors.

Seretean founded Opti-World, an Atlanta-based firm, in 1983. By 1988, the chain of optical stores was the largest in the Southeast and eighth-largest in the U.S. It had 59 locations and $67 million in annual sales when LensCrafters purchased it in 1995; several members of the company founded Nova LaserLight Cosmetic Centers, of which Seretean was chairman. He was a co-owner of WGXA, a television station in Macon, Georgia, from 1982 to 1995.

== Sports investments ==
After selling Coronet in 1971, Seretean sought "something to dabble in". After looking at acquiring the Memphis Sounds of the American Basketball Association, he acquired a stake in the Atlanta Hawks of the National Basketball Association in 1973. Seretean, who had played basketball growing up in New York City and been a fan of the team, sought to revamp the franchise's lagging business operations and poor attendance figures, leaving most basketball operations to Cotton Fitzsimmons. His tenure got off to a rocky start amid attempts by Atlanta businessman Simon Selig to buy the team and draft college star David Thompson, who chose instead to play for the ABA's Denver Nuggets. Seretean called the handling of Thompson "one of the biggest fiascos in professional sports drafting". In the first season that followed, the team got off to a 5–11 start, with only 600 season tickets sold, and fans booed Seretean. Majority owner Tom Cousins said that Seretean had authority to do what he wanted with the franchise, including relocating it.

Seretean developed a friendship with Ted Turner, who named him to the board of the Atlanta Braves of Major League Baseball after he bought the team. However, when Turner bought the Hawks in January 1977, Seretean was stripped of his general manager role and replaced with Mike Storen.

In 2003, Seretean—who remained on the Hawks board of directors—was part of the group that purchased the Hawks, Atlanta Thrashers, and operating rights to Philips Arena from AOL Time Warner. The group, Atlanta Spirit, was riven by ownership conflicts, and Seretean sold his shares in 2005.

== Personal life ==
He gave generously to Oklahoma State University and was the primary sponsor of OSU's Center for the Performing Arts and the campus wellness center, which bear his name. He was the only OSU alumnus to have two buildings named for him. He donated to Emory University, where a wellness center opened in 1997 bears his name, and was the author of the book Living Healthy to 100. Seretean was president of the Jewish Welfare Federation and built a Holocaust memorial center in Jerusalem celebrating Jews of Romanian heritage.

Seretean died in London on August 13, 2007, of a brain hemorrhage at age 83. After his death, he left an additional $5 million bequest to OSU.
