= Jesse Itzler =

American entrepreneur (born 1968)

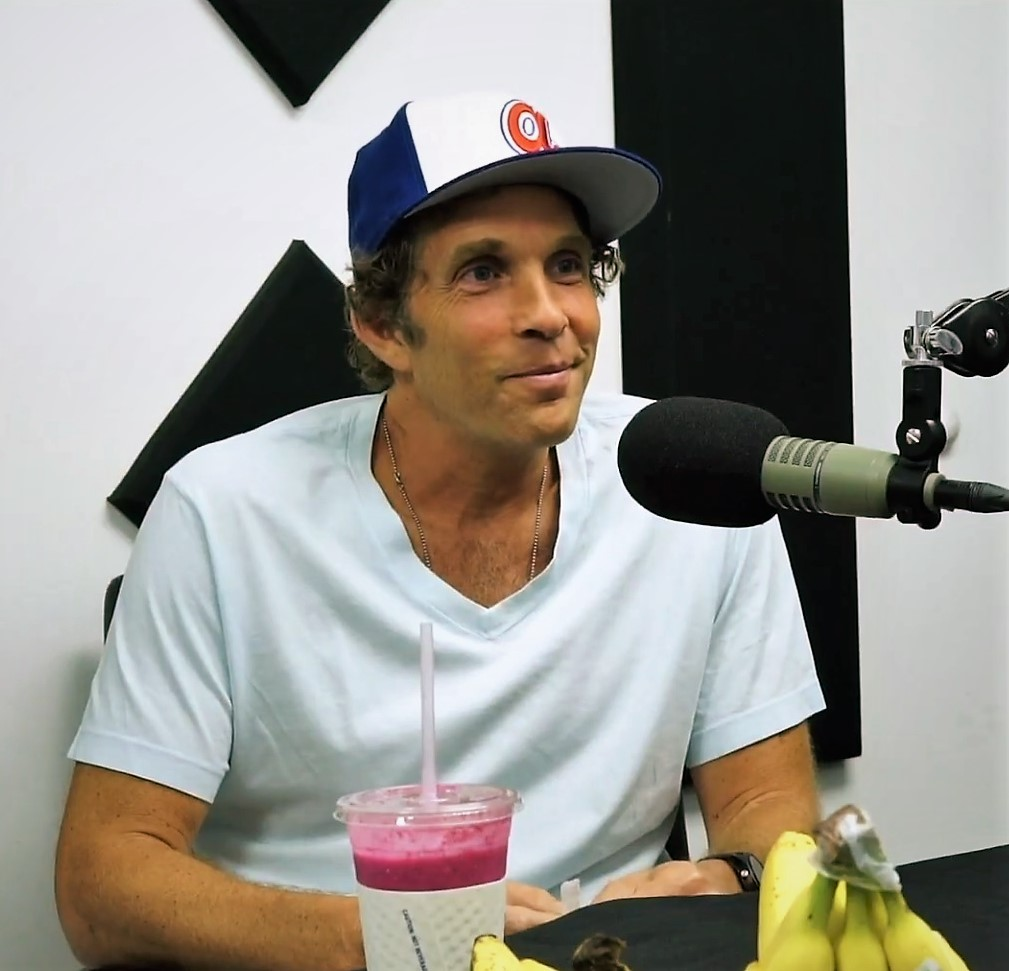
- Itzler in 2018
- Born: August 22, 1968 (age 58)
- Citizenship: American
- Education: American University (BA)
- Occupations: Founder of The 100 Mile Group, entrepreneur, author, rapper, singer, songwriter
- Spouse: Sara Blakely (m. 2008)
- Children: 4

Jesse Itzler (born August 22, 1968) is an American entrepreneur, author, and rapper. He is the co-founder of Marquis Jet, one of the largest private jet card companies in the world, a partner in Zico Coconut Water, the founder of The 100 Mile Group, and one of the owners of the Atlanta Hawks of the National Basketball Association (NBA).

== Early life and education ==
Jesse Itzler was born on August 22, 1968, to a Jewish family and raised in Roslyn, New York, on Long Island, the son of Daniel Itzler, an inventor, and Elese Itzler, the president of the Roslyn Board of Education. He was the youngest of three or four children, depending on the source. Three generations of his father's family were raised in Brooklyn.

Itzler earned his bachelor's degree in 1990 from American University. He would complete a degree in justice, law, and society.

== Career ==
=== Music career ===
After graduating from college, Itzler signed with Delicious Vinyl records as a songwriter/artist. He released his debut album Thirty Footer in Your Face using the pseudonym Jesse Jaymes in 1991. He co-wrote songs for various artists including Tone Lōc. His first released single, "College Girls (Are Easy)", became a club anthem. This was followed by his second single "Shake It Like A White Girl", which did reach 74 on the Billboard Hot 100 chart in 1991 and was featured in the soundtrack of the 2004 movie White Chicks. In 1992, Itzler wrote and sang the New York Knicks theme song "Go New York Go" as well as original songs for more than 50 other professional teams. Itzler wrote and sang the Emmy Award-winning song "I Love This Game" and also produced the theme song for Inside the NBA. Itzler is credited with campaigns for Foot Locker and Coca-Cola.

Itzler's music partner was Dana Mozie, whom he met in 1987, a man described as being from a "strikingly different background... raised in the southeast section of Washington... as streetwise as Itzler was suburban," with whom he collaborated on several musical projects in his period as Jesse Jaymes.

=== Entrepreneurship ===
In 1996, Itzler co-founded Alphabet City Sports Records with his friend Kenny Dichter. The record company is known for mixing classic arena songs with highlights of historical play-by-play calls for professional sports teams including the Wizards, the Mavericks, and the Lakers. In 1998, the company was sold to SFX.

In 2001, Itzler co-founded Marquis Jet, one of the largest private jet card companies in the world. Itzler served as the company's Vice Chairman until the company was acquired by Berkshire Hathaway, parent company of NetJets, in 2009.

In 2009, Itzler created the 100 Mile Group, a brand incubator and accelerator. The company announced a partnership with ZICO Coconut Water and the Coca-Cola company in 2009. In 2012, ZICO was acquired by Coca-Cola for an undisclosed sum.

In 2017, Itzler co-founded 29029 Everesting, an endurance challenge where participants repeatedly hike a ski mountain until they reach the elevation of Mount Everest (29,029 feet). The event has since expanded to multiple locations in the United States and Canada.

In November 2015, Itzler released his book Living With a SEAL: 31 Days Training With the Toughest Man on the Planet. The book was a New York Times Best Seller and ranked first on the LA Times book list. He released Living With the Monks: What Turning Off My Phone Taught Me about Happiness, Gratitude, and Focus in 2018. Itzler is represented by literary agent Lisa Leshne of The Leshne Agency.

Itzler founded The Big Ass Calendar Company, a productivity company that produces large-format wall calendars and planners designed to display an entire year at a glance. The calendar system emerged from Itzler's personal planning methodology, which he developed to manage his busy schedule balancing multiple business ventures and family life with four children.

== Atlanta Hawks ==
In 2015, Itzler and his wife, Sara Blakely were part of a group led by Tony Ressler along with Grant Hill, Steven Price, and Rick Schnall, that purchased the Atlanta Hawks for $850 million from Bruce Levenson.

== Personal life ==
In 2006, Itzler competed in the USA National Ultra Marathon Championship in Grapevine, Texas, successfully completing a 100-mile run in under 24 hours. Itzler finished 49th out of 80 in the SEA Paddle NYC 25 mile stand up paddle race around Manhattan in 2012.

In 2008, Itzler married Sara Blakely, the founder of Spanx, at the Gasparilla Inn and Club in Boca Grande, Florida. The couple have four children and resides in Georgia.
