= Lost Prophets – Search for the Collective =

2009 documentary film

Lost Prophets – Search for the Collective is a surf documentary that debuted in the fall of 2009. The film was directed by independent filmmaker Nathan Apffel and chronicles the lives of eight different surfers. Among them are Reef McIntosh, Brian Conley, Dave Rastovich, Hans Hagen, Nole Cossart, and Chris Del Moro. The film was narrated by Tom Morey.

It premiered with two showings to crowds of over 1,000 surf and action sports film fans at the Coast film Festival in Laguna Beach, California. After the premiere, the film embarked on a 15-city tour throughout North America, wrapping in late January 2010.

As of March 2010, more than 40,000 filmgoers have viewed the surf documentary. Through friends within the surf community, Apffel gathered backers who believed in his film's message, including Kona Brewing Company, who helped fund the tour, as well as ZICO Coconut Water and XS. Pioneering surf magazine Surfer also stepped in as media sponsor for the film, and Lost Prophets was shown in November 2009 as part of Surfer’s 50-year anniversary in Oceanside, CA.

== Synopsis ==
Lost Prophets "highlights surfers from around the world who are doing more than striving for a sponsor. They’re environmentalists, nonprofit organizers and spiritual people performing selfless acts..." Outside writer Lisa Lombardi says the film "embraces the original notion of surfing as an escape, a joy, and a way to connect with nature...the movie is a gorgeous array of color, action, and editing."

== Screenings and film festivals ==
After its North America tour, Lost Prophets was screened at a number of film festivals across the globe, including the Newport Beach Film Festival, Greenroom Festival in Japan, and Taranaki Arts Festival in New Zealand. Apffel is currently directing a longer cut of the film with more narratives that is tailored to a more mainstream audience.

'So Cal natives Nathan Apffel and Hans Hagen's beautifully shot surf film that (we can vouch) transcends genre with a pure aesthetic that leaves even the most surf-shy viewer longing for the perfect tube.' Riviera Magazine

== Independent Filmmaking ==
Apffel directed and was part of a team that won an Emmy in 2008 for their work on FiNS, part of Fox Network's Fuel TV and he self-funded the Lost Prophets venture, which totaled over $150,000. The project is a testament to independent filmmaking. Director Nathan Apffel, along with Hans Hagen (professional surfer, Executive Producer, and Music Supervisor) pored over the project; the end product, a film that serves as a beacon for passionate independent filmmakers and artists.

== Awards ==
Lost Prophets was nominated for "Best Cinematography" for Surfer’s Surfer Poll/Video Awards '09, “Best Film” at X-Dance Action Sports Film Festival (the action sports entity of Sundance Film Festival) and won “Best Original Score” for "it's moody, highly unique music that created a soulful tone for the film about nomadic surfers."

== Filmmaker ==
A competitive freestyle BMX rider in his teens, Apffel's lifepath was drastically altered when he fell off a cliff in Cabo San Lucas, Mexico at the age of 16. He was life-flighted to Scripps Memorial Hospital in La Jolla, CA and quickly prepped for brain surgery due to excessive swelling and bleeding on the brain. During pre-surgery testing, however, the doctors found that Apffel had suffered a grand mal seizure due to head trauma. The surgery was postponed, the bleeding and swelling subsided slowly, and days later, he was released on strict orders that he could not take part in activities where he could hit his head again. Because head injuries are cumulative, another hit could be extremely detrimental or fatal. His driver's license was suspended, and he endured a year full of EEG's and MRI's. What followed was a new cautiousness, but Apffel couldn't leave his passion for surfing and action sports behind. He secured a small loan and purchased a Sony Handycam and laptop. He then took some courses and delved into sports, surf, and water photography while his filming career took root.
