= Go New York Go =

1993 single by Jesse Itzler

Single by Jesse Itzler
- Released: 1993
- Recorded: 1993
- Genre: Hip-hop
- Length: 1:32
- Songwriters: Jesse Itzler, Dana Mozie
- Producer: A. Cohen

Music video
- "Go New York Go" (1994 version) on YouTube

"Go New York Go", also known as "Go, New York, Go", "Go NY Go" or "Go New York, Go New York, Go", is a song written and performed by American entrepreneur, author, songwriter and rapper Jesse Itzler and songwriter/promoter Dana Mozie in 1993. The song is the anthem of the New York Knicks playing before and during every home game for the Knicks at Madison Square Garden.

== Background ==
Itzler was raised in Roslyn, New York, and three generations of his father's family were raised in Brooklyn. Itzler began his music career recording in his college dormitory, and he signed a recording deal in 1991, with two of his songs charting on the Billboard Hot 100. By 1993 his rapping career had plateaued, but he continued songwriting.

In the late 1980s, Mozie was a college student promoting rap music in the Washington metropolitan area. Eventually he decided to move to New York City to work with Salt-N-Pepa and Itzler moved to New York as well. Mozie started at WOL and made introductions with Sean Combs and Digable Planets. His backstory includes a 1989 invite from Salt-N-Pepa to come to New York to work for them.

One of Itzler's clients was a clothing company by Knicks executive Ernie Grunfeld's wife Nancy Grunfeld. Some accounts of the history of the song note that he worked on a jingle for a clothing company by Knicks executive Dave Checketts' wife Deb. Both accounts note that he requested the opportunity in 1993 to write the song to amp up the crowds at Knicks home games. Itzler recorded the song in the closet of his Upper East Side apartment. Mozie's backstory includes getting the Knicks job by entering a songwriting contest. Both Itzler and Mozie are officially credited for the song and there are accounts in the press that both are almost the sole creative source of the song. At first only some of the fans got caught up in the song, but gradually more and more fans reacted to it, before local radio stations started playing it and Budweiser and The Wiz licensed the song. That original version of the song became popular during the Knicks 1994 NBA playoffs run.

In addition to the original version, the song is frequently updated, with updated versions of the song including performances by P. Diddy, Q-Tip, and Run DMC. Mozie is described as the producer of the 1997 version that included free appearances by DJ Run, Puff Daddy and Ed Lover.

== Legacy ==
Before the 1994 playoffs ended, NBA Entertainment hired Itzler to produce a 60-second "I Love This Game"-themed commercial featuring celebrities such as Spike Lee and Cindy Crawford. The following season, both the Washington Bullets and the Charlotte Hornets sought Mozie and Itzler's anthem songwriting services. They went on to write songs for several other professional basketball teams including the Los Angeles Lakers, Milwaukee Bucks, and New York Liberty. The NBA teams own the intellectual property rights to the rally songs and pay a flat fee. Although the pay was $5000 ($11144 in 2025) for "Go New York Go", by 2004, Itzler was making $50,000 ($85227 in 2025) for his songs. He won a Sports Emmy Award for his role in the "I Love This Game" music campaign.

In 1996, Itzler and Mozie started a company to produce music compilations for all major league sports. Within three years, his company had expanded its client list to include Foot Locker and Coca-Cola and was bought out for $4 million ($7.9 million in 2025) plus a percentage of future earnings. In 2015, he became a minority part-owner of the Atlanta Hawks. By 2023, he had written songs for over 50 sports teams and retired.
