= Rick Schnall =

American businessman (born 1969)

- Born: 1969 or 1970 (age 55–56); United States
- Education: University of Pennsylvania (BA); Harvard University (MBA)
- Known for: Co-President of Clayton, Dubilier & Rice; Minority owner of the Atlanta Hawks; Majority owner of the Charlotte Hornets
- Relatives: Carl Icahn (uncle)
- Basketball career

Charlotte Hornets
- Positions: Majority Owner, Co-Chairman
- League: NBA

Rick Schnall (born 1969/1970) is an American businessman, co-president of private equity firm Clayton, Dubilier & Rice, minority owner of the Atlanta Hawks, and among the majority owners of the Charlotte Hornets.

== Biography ==
Schnall is a graduate of the University of Pennsylvania and the Harvard Business School. After school, he worked for Smith Barney and Donaldson Lufkin & Jenrette. In 1996, he joined Clayton, Dubilier & Rice eventually reaching partner where he started and oversees the healthcare, tech and financial services verticals.

=== Atlanta Hawks ===
In 2015, Schnall was part of a group led by Tony Ressler along with Grant Hill, Sarah Blakely, Jesse Itzler, and Steven Price, that successfully purchased the Atlanta Hawks for $850 million. He was selling his stake in the Hawks as of July 2023.

=== Charlotte Hornets ===
In June 2023, Schnall along with Gabe Plotkin successfully purchased the Charlotte Hornets from majority owner, Michael Jordan.

== Personal life ==
Schnall is of Jewish descent and lives in New York City. He is the nephew of billionaire investor Carl Icahn.

Sporting positions
Preceded by Michael Jordan	Charlotte Bobcats/Hornets principal owner 2023–present Served alongside: Gabe Plotkin	Incumbent
