= Townsquare Media =

American radio network and media company

Townsquare Media, Inc.
- Formerly: Regent Communications (1994–2010)
- Type: Public
- Traded as: NYSE: TSQ (Class A); Russell Microcap Index component
- Industry: Mass media
- Founded: 1994; 32 years ago
- Headquarters: Purchase, New York, United States
- Key people: Steven Price; (executive chairman); Bill Wilson; (CEO); Stuart Rosenstein; (executive VP & CFO)
- Services: Digital media, radio
- Revenue: ▼US$ 441.22 million (2017)
- Operating income: ▲US$ 84.73 million (2017)
- Net income: ▼US$ 10.25 million (2017)
- Total assets: ▼US$ 122.63 million (2017)
- Total equity: ▲US$ 390.05 million (2017)
- Owners: Oaktree Capital Management (47%); The Madison Square Garden Company (12%)
- Number of employees: ~2,900 (2017)
- Website: townsquaremedia.com

Townsquare Media, Inc. (formerly Regent Communications until 2010) is an American radio network and media company based in Purchase, New York. The company started in radio and expanded into digital media toward the end of the 2000s, starting with the acquisition of the MOG Music Network. As of June 2024, Townsquare was the third-largest AM–FM operator in the country, owning 349 radio stations in 74 markets.

== History ==
=== As Regent Communications ===
Regent Communications logo before rebranding

Townsquare Media was established as Regent Communications by Terry Jacobs in 1994, after Sam Zell purchased the company he founded in 1979, Jacor Communications. Bill Stakelin later shared chief status in the company with Jacobs, and the two established JS Communications, later selling Regent to Jacor in 1997. Stakelin and Jacobs resurrected the Regent name to replace JS, with approval by Jacor. Jacobs left the company in 2005.

On October 27, 2008, Regent Broadcasting joined Radiolicious and began streaming on the iPhone and iPod Touch. Regent is the first major radio group to contract for all of its streaming stations to be available through the Radiolicious application.

=== As Townsquare Media ===
Regent filed for Chapter 11 bankruptcy protection on March 1, 2010, with $211.3 million in debt, $166.5 million in assets, and a pre-arranged plan for exiting bankruptcy, with the United States Bankruptcy Court for the District of Delaware. The filing plan made Oaktree Capital Management the majority owner of Regent after the bankruptcy and gave the old shareholders 12.8 cents per share. After the privatization, the company was renamed Townsquare Media by its co-founders Steven Price, Stuart Rosenstein, Alex Berkett, Dhruv Prasad, and Scott Schatz. Gap Broadcasting Group, another radio group owned by Oaktree, was merged into Townsquare, giving it ownership of 171 radio stations in 36 markets.

In December 2010, the company began to expand its digital media operations, overhauling its stations' websites and launching a new country music news website known as Taste of Country.

Townsquare acquired a number of stations from Double O Radio in August 2011.

On April 30, 2012, Townsquare Media announced a deal to acquire 55 stations in 11 markets from Cumulus Media, in exchange for Townsquare's stations in the markets of Bloomington and Peoria, IL and $126 million.

On August 24, 2012, Townsquare reached a deal to acquire the MOG Music Network, an advertising network for music blogs. The network was part of MOG, a streaming music service that had previously reached a deal to be acquired by Beats Electronics.

On October 1, 2012, Townsquare Media created Townsquare Interactive. Townsquare Interactive is the digital marketing division of Townsquare Media and focuses on creating comprehensive web presences for small businesses across the United States.

In June 2013, Townsquare announced it would acquire a number of music-related blogs from AOL, including The Boombox, The Boot, and Noisecreep, along with ComicsAlliance. The deal came following the abrupt shutdown of AOL's Music division in April 2013.

On August 29, 2013, it was announced that Cumulus would purchase Dial Global, after the programming syndication service was showing signs of financial distress in late 2012. Cumulus paid $260 million for this service, a portion of which was used to pay off Dial's debt before it was folded into Cumulus. To make the sale work, Cumulus once again made a pair of station deals with Townsquare Media; the first deal sent 53 stations in Danbury, CT; Rockford, IL; Cedar Rapids, IA; Quad Cities, IA–IL; Waterloo, IA; Portland, ME; Battle Creek, MI; Kalamazoo, MI; Lansing, MI; Faribault, MN; Rochester, MN; and Portsmouth, NH, to Townsquare for $238 million. The second sent 15 more stations in Dubuque, IA and Poughkeepsie, NY, in exchange for Peak Broadcasting's Fresno cluster. Peak, which like Dial Global and Townsquare has a large investment held by Oaktree, also had its Boise cluster folded into Townsquare. Due to market overlaps, three of Townsquare's newly acquired stations were placed in a divestiture trust. The acquisition of the Cumulus stations closed on November 14, 2013.

On February 25, 2014, Townsquare Ignite was created to offer business owners across the United States online advertising solutions, such as PPC, SEM, social media advertising and website retargeting.

On June 24, 2014, Townsquare Media filed for an IPO on the New York Stock Exchange, valued at $143.8 million. On July 24, 2014, Townsquare Media became a public company with an initial offering price of $11 a share.

In September 2014, Townsquare Media acquired XXL, King, and Antenna from Harris Publications. Townsquare then ceased print publication of XXL.

In August 2015, Townsquare Media acquired North American Midway Entertainment of Farmland, Indiana, an amusement park company with operations in the United States and Canada.

On August 17, 2016, The Madison Square Garden Company acquired a 12% stake in Townsquare Media.

On October 16, 2017, Townsquare Media announced the transition of Steven Price, Townsquare's founder and chief executive officer, to the new role of Executive Chairman of the Board. He was replaced by Bill Wilson and Dhruv Prasad, who are serving as Co-Chief Executive Officers. In addition, Erik Hellum was announced as Chief Operating Officer, Local Media.

On February 15, 2018, Townsquare Media acquired classic rock station WOUR-FM 96.9 from Galaxy Communications.

On January 2, 2019, Townsquare Media announced the departure of Co-Chief Executive Officer Dhruv Prasad and the transition of Bill Wilson from Co-Chief Executive Officer to sole chief executive officer of the company.

On March 24, 2022. Townsquare Media announced that it would acquire Cherry Creek Media for $18.75 million, including all of 35 stations that Cherry Creek owns. The deal was set to close by the end of June, and was consummated on June 17.

== Assets ==
=== Web publications and services ===
- Antenna – general publication marketed toward youth readers; formerly a print magazine
- The Boombox – dedicated to hip hop music; previously owned by AOL
- The Boot – dedicated to country music; previously owned by AOL
- BrooklynVegan – from July 2015 to January 2021; currently owned by Project M Group.
- ComicsAlliance – dedicated to comic books; previously owned by AOL
- Diffuser – website about music.
- Invisible Oranges – dedicated to heavy metal music, from July 2015 to January 2021; currently owned by Project M Group.
- Just Jared and Just Jared Jr – dedicated to pop culture
- King – publication marketed toward African American men; formerly a print magazine
- Hype Machine – aggregator of music blogs; previously owned by SpinMedia
- Loudwire – dedicated to heavy metal and hard rock music
- Noisecreep – dedicated to heavy metal and hard rock music; previously owned by AOL
- PopCrush – dedicated to pop music; also syndicated as a radio program known as PopCrush Nights
- ScreenCrush – dedicated to film and television
- Taste of Country – dedicated to country music
- Ultimate Classic Rock – dedicated to rock music categorized as classic; also a radio show on some Townsquare stations
- XXL – online magazine and website dedicated to hip hop; formerly a print magazine

=== Other ===
- Wake Up Wyoming – talk show and website hosted by Glenn Woods and affiliated with Townsquare stations KGAB and KTWO
