= Bruce Levenson =

American businessman

- Born: October 1, 1949 (age 76); Washington, D.C., U.S.
- Other name: Bruce D. Levenson
- Education: Washington University in St. Louis; American University
- Occupations: United Communications Group, Founding partner; Atlanta Hawks LLC, Partner and managing director
- Known for: Co-owner of the Atlanta Hawks
- Spouse: Karen Boyarsky Levenson
- Children: 3

Bruce Levenson (born October 1, 1949) is an American businessman, former NBA team owner, and philanthropist. He was a co-owner of Atlanta Hawks, LLC (formerly Atlanta Spirit LLC), which also owns and operates Philips Arena. Levenson has also served as the Hawks' Governor on the NBA Board of Governors since 2004. Levenson also co-founded United Communications Group (UCG) in 1977. He was a founding board member and is on the Board of Directors for the publicly traded TechTarget, an IT industry media company.

== Early life and education ==
Bruce Levenson was born in Washington, D.C. and grew up in Chevy Chase, Maryland. He is of Jewish descent. He later attended college at Washington University in St. Louis and graduated from law school at American University. While attending law school at night, Levenson began his journalism career at the Washington Star.

== Career ==
=== UCG ===
Levenson co-founded United Communications Group (UCG) with Ed Peskowitz in 1977. Based in Gaithersburg, Maryland, Levenson and Peskowitz started the company in Levenson's apartment, publishing a newsletter, Oil Express, focusing on developments in the oil industry. UCG acquired other newsletters and launched databases including Oil Price Information Service (OPIS). UCG was a privately held business information company that specialized in data, news, and analysis for healthcare, energy, mortgage banking, technology, telecommunications, and other industries. UCG also owned and operated GasBuddy, a mobile application that assists drivers in finding local low gas prices.

=== Atlanta Hawks ===
In 2004, Atlanta Spirit LLC, now known as Atlanta Hawks LLC, was formed to buy the Atlanta Hawks from Turner Broadcasting. Levenson and Ed Peskowitz are majority partners of Atlanta Hawks, LLC, a group of businessmen who collectively own the Atlanta Hawks professional basketball team and Philips Arena. The purchase originally included the Atlanta Thrashers as well, but the group sold the NHL team in 2011. Levenson was the team's managing partner and a member of the NBA Board of Governors.

In 2012, Levenson hired Danny Ferry as the Hawks general manager and president of basketball operations. Previously, Ferry played for the Cleveland Cavaliers and later served as the general manager for the Cavaliers and was the vice president of operations for the San Antonio Spurs before going to the Hawks.

In March 2014, Levenson and his wife accompanied the Hawks basketball team and staff to the U.S. Holocaust Museum in Washington, D.C. Levenson's mother-in-law Irene Boyarsky, a Holocaust survivor, also attended the trip with the team. Levenson spoke with the team about her experiences before and during the tour.

== Sale of the team amid email controversy ==
Later that year, Levenson announced that he would sell his share of the ownership group after an email he sent in August of 2012 surfaced during an internal investigation. The email discussed the team's African-American fan base and included such controversial observations as Levenson's belief that "Southern whites" felt uncomfortable at games. Levenson contends that he self-reported the email, and that his disclosure was unrelated to the ongoing investigation.

Levenson's email included this paragraph: "I have (said) I want some white cheerleaders and while I don’t care what the color of the artist is, I want the music to be music familiar to a 40-year-old white guy if that’s our season (ticket) demo. I have also balked when every fan picked out of the crowd to shoot shots in some time-out contest is black. I have even bitched that the kiss cam is too black.”

The franchise's other minority owners later committed to sell their shares and Levenson coordinated the sale of the team through an investment banking firm. In April 2015, the franchise was sold to billionaire Tony Ressler for $850 million which was approved by the NBA Board of Governors before the 2015–16 NBA season. Atlanta Journal-Constitution sportswriter Jeff Schultz heralded the ownership change, referring to co-owners Levenson, Ed Peskowitz and Michael Gearon Jr. as "Team Chucklehead," which he characterized as "the most dysfunctional ownership group in professional sports history."

=== Other activities ===
Levenson is a founding board member and on the Board of Directors of TechTarget. The company spun out of development under UCG and Levenson served as a director of the company from its founding in 1999 until 2012.

Levenson was an adviser for BIA Digital Partners, a private equity firm. He has also was on the Board of Directors of the Newsletter and Electronic Publishers Association (NEPA), and was inducted into the Software and Information Industry Association's Hall of Fame in 1997 with Ed Peskowitz for their work with UCG.

== Philanthropy ==
Levenson has also been an active participant in various philanthropic organizations such as Community Foundation of Washington, D.C. and the Hoop Dreams Foundation. Previously, he served as president of the Washington chapter of I Have a Dream Foundation, an organization helping low-income children pursue higher education.

Levenson is a founding donor to the U.S. Holocaust Museum and funds the Museum's Bringing the Lessons Home program, which teaches inner city students the lessons of the Holocaust and trains them to be tour guides at the Museum. His mother-in-law is a survivor of The Holocaust. He has also made significant donations to the SEED Foundation and Seeds of Peace. Levenson supports various other Jewish causes including Birthright Israel, the Jewish Federation, the Jewish Youth Philanthropy Institute, and BBYO, a Jewish-American youth movement.

In 2010, Levenson and his wife spearheaded the development of the Center for Philanthropy and Nonprofit Leadership at the University of Maryland and provided seed funding to the institution that educates students on how to run nonprofit organizations and engages the university to inform and motivate philanthropic activities. The University later launched the Do Good Institute and established through $75 million of state funding and donations from the Levenson family.

In April 2013, Levenson was one of 100 prominent American Jews who sent a letter to Israeli Prime Minister Benjamin Netanyahu urging him to "work closely" with Secretary of State John Kerry "to devise pragmatic initiatives, consistent with Israel's security needs, which would represent Israel's readiness to make painful territorial sacrifices for the sake of peace."

In 2015, Levenson and his wife Karen were chairs of the John F. Kennedy Center's Concert Against Hate in Washington, D.C.. The concert, benefiting the Anti-Defamation League, pays tribute to individuals who have stood up to hatred and bigotry. The event established the "Levenson Family Defender of Democracy Award" and the first award was given to Michael Signer, mayor of Charlottesville.

== Personal life ==
Levenson and his wife Karen (née Boyarsky) have homes in Atlanta and Potomac, Maryland. They have three sons.

Sporting positions
Preceded by Ted Turner	Atlanta Thrashers principal owner 2004–2011; Served alongside: Ed Peskowitz	Succeeded by Mark Chipman as Winnipeg Jets
Preceded by Ted Turner	Atlanta Hawks principal owner 2004–2015; Served alongside: Michael Gearon Jr.	Succeeded by Tony Ressler
