= Zico (drink) =

American beverage company

Zico Rising
- Industry: Beverages
- Founded: 2004; 22 years ago New York City, U.S.
- Founder: Mark Rampolla
- Headquarters: El Segundo, California, U.S.
- Parent: PowerPlant Ventures
- Website: zico.com

Zico, stylized as ZICO, is a brand of coconut water and other drinks containing coconut water. The drinks are produced by Zico Rising, originally founded as Zico Beverages in 2004.

In 2013, the business was acquired by the Coca-Cola Company. Seven years later, in January 2021, the company was sold back to its founder, Mark Rampolla, through PowerPlant Ventures.

== History ==
Zico Beverages was founded in 2004 by Mark Rampolla after being introduced to coconut water as a Peace Corps volunteer in Central America.

In 2009, the Coca-Cola Company purchased a minority stake in the company and increased that to a majority stake in 2012. In 2013, Coca-Cola purchased the outstanding stake, thus acquiring the entire Zico business and brand. In 2020, Coca-Cola announced it would discontinue the Zico products by the end of the year, citing a sales decline of more than 20% for coconut water products in the preceding five years, an inability to catch up to the market segment leader Vita Coco, and the economic disruption caused by the COVID-19 pandemic.

In January 2021, PowerPlant Ventures announced its acquisition of the Zico brand from the Coca-Cola Company. The brand's ownership thus came full circle, as PowerPlant Ventures was co-founded and is co-led by Mark Rampolla. The business was renamed to Zico Rising.

== Ingredients and flavors ==
In 2017, the available flavors were natural, chocolate, jalapeño mango, and watermelon raspberry.

As of 2023, three basic variants of Zico drinks were offered.

- Zico Natural contains only pasteurized coconut water (not from concentrate).
- Zico Chocolate contains 70% coconut water, water, cane sugar, cocoa powder, and other ingredients, and is marketed as a "dairy-free alternative to chocolate milk with only 1/3 of the sugar".
- Zico Hydrate is available in Coconut Lime flavor and contains 30% coconut water, flavorings, and other ingredients. Two other flavors of Zico Hydrate, namely Fruit Punch and Tropical, are also described on the official website.
