= Tony Ressler =

American businessman (born 1960)

- Born: October 12, 1960 (age 66); Washington D.C., U.S.
- Education: Georgetown University (BSFS); Columbia University (MBA)
- Occupations: Investor, sports team owner
- Known for: Co-founder of Apollo Management and Ares Management; Owner of the Atlanta Hawks
- Spouse: Jami Gertz (m. 1989)
- Children: 4
- Relatives: Debra Black (sister); Leon Black (brother-in-law)

Antony P. Ressler (born October 12, 1960) is an American businessman. He co-founded the private equity firms Apollo Global Management in 1990, and Ares Management in 1997. Ressler is also owner of the Atlanta Hawks basketball team, acquiring them in 2015. He is married to actress Jami Gertz. His net worth was estimated at $10.5 billion in 2026.

== Biography ==
Ressler was born in Washington D.C. on October 12, 1960, to a Jewish family, one of five children of Dorothy and Ira Ressler. His father was an attorney and World War II veteran. Ressler earned a BSFS from Georgetown University's Walsh School of Foreign Service and an MBA from Columbia Business School. After graduating, he worked at Drexel Burnham Lambert, eventually reaching senior vice president in the high yield bond department with responsibility for the new issue/syndicate desk.

In 1990, on the heels of the collapse of Drexel Burnham Lambert, he co-founded the private equity firm Apollo Global Management with Leon Black, Drexel's managing director, head of the Mergers & Acquisitions Group, and co-head of the Corporate Finance Department; John Hannan, Drexel's former co-director of international finance; Craig Cogut, a lawyer who worked with Drexel's high-yield division in Los Angeles; Arthur Bilger, the former head of the Drexel's corporate finance department; and Marc Rowan, Josh Harris and Michael Gross, all of whom worked under Black in the mergers and acquisitions department. In 1997, he co-founded Ares Management with former Apollo Global Management co-worker John H. Kissick and Bennett Rosenthal, who joined the group from the global leveraged finance group at Merrill Lynch.

Ressler is a member of the executive committee of the board of directors of the Cedars-Sinai Medical Center; finance chair and member of the executive committee of the Los Angeles County Museum of Art; a board member of Campbell Hall Episcopal School in Studio City, California; and one of the founding members of the board and finance chair of the Painted Turtle Camp, an organization that takes children with chronic and life-threatening illnesses on camping trips. Ressler is a supporter of military veterans through the work of The Greatest Generations Foundation.

=== Sports ===
In 2005, he belonged to an investment group led by Mark Attanasio that acquired Major League Baseball's Milwaukee Brewers.

In June 2015, he led a group that acquired the NBA's Atlanta Hawks basketball team for US$730 million. It was ultimately sold to him for $850 million. Minority investors included Grant Hill, Sara Blakely, Jesse Itzler, Steven Price, and Rick Schnall.

== Personal life ==
On June 16, 1989, he married actress Jami Gertz. They live in Los Angeles, and have a daughter and three sons. Gertz-Ressler High Academy, a member of Alliance College-Ready Public Schools, is named after the couple. They are members of the Wilshire Boulevard Temple.

Ressler's sister, Broadway producer Debra Ressler, is married to Apollo co-founder Leon Black. His brother, Richard Ressler, is a principal and founder of CIM Investment management.

Sporting positions
Preceded by Bruce Levenson; Michael Gearon Jr.	Atlanta Hawks principal owner 2015–present	Incumbent
