= Sara Blakely =

American businesswoman (born 1971)

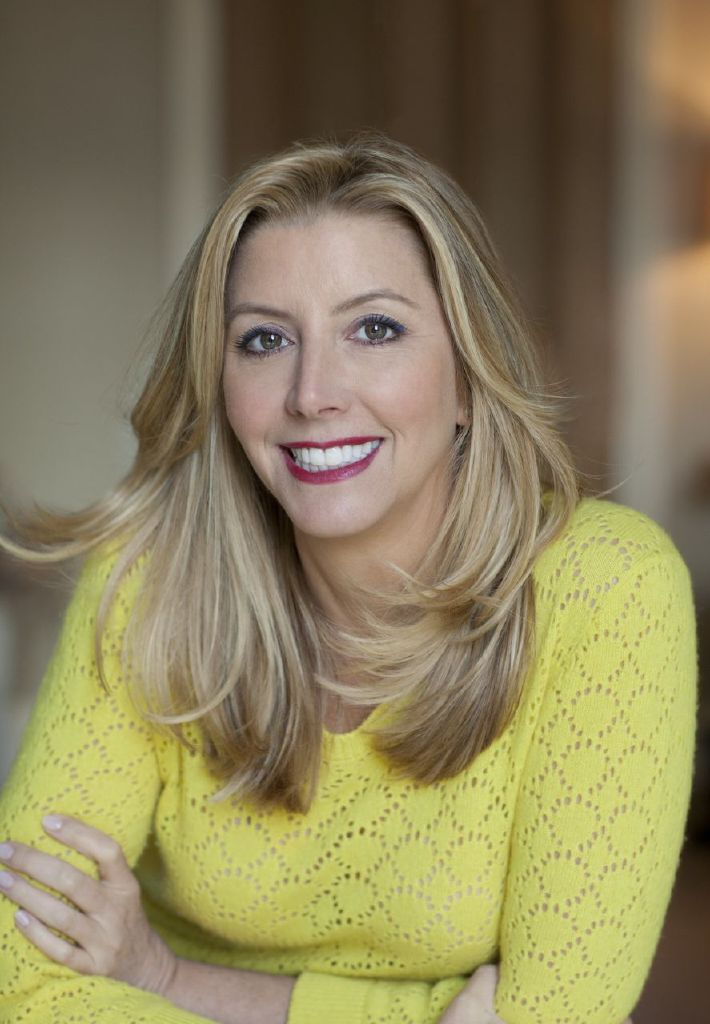
- Blakely in 2014
- Born: Sara Blakely; February 27, 1971 (age 55); Clearwater, Florida, U.S.
- Education: Florida State University
- Occupation: Businesswoman
- Known for: Founder and owner of Spanx; Minority owner of the Atlanta Hawks
- Spouse: Jesse Itzler (m. 2008)
- Children: 4

Sara Blakely (born February 27, 1971) is an American businesswoman and philanthropist. She founded Spanx, an intimate apparel company with pants and leggings, in Atlanta, Georgia. In 2024, Blakely created the footwear brand, Sneex.

In 2012, Blakely was named in Time magazine's "Time 100" annual list of the 100 most influential people in the world. In 2014, she was listed as the 93rd most powerful woman in the world by Forbes.

== Early life and education ==
Blakely was born on February 27, 1971, in Clearwater, Florida. She is the daughter of Ellen (née Ford), an artist, and personal injury lawyer John Blakely. She has a brother, artist Ford Blakely. She attended Clearwater High School and graduated from Florida State University with a communication degree, where she was a member of the Delta Delta Delta sorority.

== Early career ==
Although Blakely planned to become an attorney, she reconsidered after scoring very poorly on the Law School Admission Test; she instead accepted a job at Walt Disney World in Orlando, Florida, where she worked for three months. She also occasionally worked as a stand-up comedian during this period.

After her short stint at Disney, Blakely accepted a job with office supply company Danka, where she sold fax machines door-to-door. She was quite successful in sales and was promoted to national sales trainer at the age of 25. Forced to wear pantyhose in the hot Florida climate for her sales role, Blakely disliked the appearance of the seamed foot while wearing open-toed shoes but liked the way that the control-top model eliminated panty lines and made her body appear firmer. For her attendance at a private party, she experimented by cutting off the feet of her pantyhose while wearing them under a new pair of slacks and found that the pantyhose continuously rolled up her legs, but she also achieved the desired result.

== Spanx ==
At age 27, Blakely relocated to Atlanta, Georgia, and while still working at Danka, spent the next two years and $5,000 savings (equivalent to $9,900 in 2025) researching and developing her hosiery idea.

Blakely then drove to North Carolina, the location of most of America's hosiery mills, to present her idea. She was turned away by every representative; these companies were used to dealing with established companies, and did not see the value of her idea. Two weeks after arriving home from her North Carolina trip, Blakely received a call from a mill operator based in Asheboro, North Carolina, who offered to support Blakely's concept, as he had received strong encouragement from his three daughters. Blakely further explained in 2011 that the experience of developing her idea also revealed to her that the hosiery manufacturing industry was overseen solely by men who were not using the products they were producing.

The creation of the initial product prototype was completed over the course of a year.

Blakely then returned to a patent attorney to finalize her application prior to her submission to the United States Patent and Trademark Office (USPTO) and he agreed to assist her for a sum of $750. Following the submission of the online application, she then worked on the packaging of her product.

Blakely used her credit card to purchase the "Spanx" trademark on the USPTO website for $150.

She managed to arrange a meeting with a representative of the Neiman Marcus Group, at which she changed into the product in the ladies restroom in the presence of the Neiman Marcus buyer to prove the benefits of her innovation. Blakely's product was sold in seven Neiman Marcus stores as a result of the meeting; Bloomingdales, Saks, and Bergdorf Goodman soon followed. Around this time, Blakely sent a basket of products to Oprah Winfrey's television program, with a gift card that explained what she was attempting to develop.

Blakely initially handled all aspects of the business, including marketing, logistics and product positioning, preferring the location of Spanx alongside shoes in retail outlets, rather than in hosiery sections; however, her boyfriend at the time, a healthcare consultant, later resigned from his job and joined in the running of the business. Blakely was contacting friends and acquaintances, including those from her past, and asking them to seek out her products at select department stores in exchange for a check that she would send to them by mail as a token of appreciation.

In November 2000, Winfrey named Spanx one of her "Favorite Things," which led to a significant rise in popularity and sales, as well as Blakely's resignation from Danka. Spanx achieved $4 million in sales in its first year and $10 million in sales in its second year. In 2001, Blakely signed a contract with QVC, the home shopping channel.

In 2012, Blakely landed on the cover of Forbes magazine for being the youngest self-made female billionaire in the world.

In October 2013, Blakely explained that her ambition is to design the world's most comfortable high-heel shoe prior to retirement. She was listed as the 93rd most powerful woman in the world by Forbes.

In 2015, Blakely and her husband Jesse Itzler were part of a group led by Tony Ressler that purchased the Atlanta Hawks for $850 million.

In October 2021, The Blackstone Group acquired a majority stake in Spanx, Inc. The company was valued at $1.2 billion. Blakely retained her position as Executive Chairwoman. Forbes estimated her net worth after the deal at $1.3 billion. To celebrate the transaction, Blakely gave each of her 750 employees $10,000 in cash and let them purchase two first-class plane tickets to any destination they desired.

== Sneex ==
In 2024, Blakely created Sneex, a footwear brand focused on high-heeled sneakers.

== Television ==
In 2005, Blakely attained second place as a contestant on The Rebel Billionaire, a reality television series that introduced her to Richard Branson, who later supported Blakely in her endeavors as both an entrepreneur and philanthropist. She later starred as one of the judges on ABC's reality television series, American Inventor, alongside George Foreman, Pat Croce and Peter Jones.

She was a guest investor on several episodes in seasons 9 and 10 of Shark Tank.

She also appeared in a very brief cameo, as herself, on "Elmsley Court," episode 12 of Billions Season 3.

== Philanthropy ==
In 2006, Blakely launched the Sara Blakely Foundation to help women through education and entrepreneurial training. Richard Branson acted as a mentor to Blakely and, at the conclusion of The Rebel Billionaire, surprised Blakely with a $750,000 check to start the Foundation.

Since its launch, The Sara Blakely Foundation has funded scholarships for young women at the Community and Individual Development Association City Campus in South Africa and Blakely appeared on The Oprah Winfrey Show in 2006, donating $1 million to the Oprah Winfrey Leadership Academy for Girls. In 2013 Blakely became the first female billionaire to join the "Giving Pledge," Bill Gates and Warren Buffett's pledge, whereby the world's richest people donate at least half of their wealth to charity.

In 2019, Blakely paid $162,500 at an auction for the black pants worn by Olivia Newton-John in Grease; the proceeds from which benefited Newton-John's cancer treatment center in Melbourne, Australia.

The next year, Blakely pledged to give $5 million to support female-run small businesses during the coronavirus pandemic.

In 2026, Florida State University awarded Sara Blakely with Honorary Doctor of Humane Letters to commemorate her work as an inventor and philanthropist.

== Personal life ==
In 2008, Blakely married Jesse Itzler, the co-founder of Marquis Jet. Together, they have four children. She is a convert to Judaism.

== See also ==
- Women in business

== Bibliography ==
- L'Ambition, ou l'épopée de soi, Vincent Cespedes, Paris, Flammarion, 2013, p. 263-273.
