= Atlanta Hawks =

National Basketball Association team in Atlanta, Georgia

- 2026–27 Atlanta Hawks season
- Conference: Eastern
- Division: Southeast
- Founded: 1946
- History: Buffalo Bisons; 1946 (NBL); Tri-Cities Blackhawks; 1946–1949 (NBL); 1949–1951 (NBA); Milwaukee Hawks; 1951–1955; St. Louis Hawks; 1955–1968; Atlanta Hawks; 1968–present
- Arena: State Farm Arena
- Location: Atlanta, Georgia
- Team colors: Torch red, legacy yellow, infinity black, gray
- Main sponsor: Paze
- CEO: Steve Koonin
- General manager: Onsi Saleh
- Head coach: Quin Snyder
- Ownership: Tony Ressler Jami Gertz
- Affiliation: College Park Skyhawks
- Championships: 1 (1958)
- Conference titles: 0
- Division titles: 13 (1957, 1958, 1959, 1960, 1961, 1968, 1970, 1980, 1987, 1994, 2015, 2021, 2026)
- Retired numbers: 6 (9, 21, 23, 44, 55, 59)
- Website: nba.com/hawks
Association	Icon	Statement
City

The Atlanta Hawks are an American professional basketball team based in Atlanta. The Hawks compete in the National Basketball Association (NBA) as a member of the Southeast Division of the Eastern Conference. The team plays its home games at State Farm Arena.

The team's origins can be traced to the establishment of the Buffalo Bisons in 1946 in Buffalo, New York, a member of the National Basketball League (NBL) owned by Ben Kerner and Leo Ferris. After 38 days in Buffalo, the team moved to Moline, Illinois, where they were renamed the Tri-Cities Blackhawks. In 1949, they joined the NBA as part of the merger between the NBL and the Basketball Association of America (BAA), and briefly had Red Auerbach as coach. In 1951, Kerner moved the team to Milwaukee, where they changed their name to the Milwaukee Hawks. Kerner and the team moved again in 1955 to St. Louis, where as the St. Louis Hawks they won their first (and thus far only) NBA Championship in 1958 and qualified to play in the NBA Finals in 1957, 1960 and 1961. The Hawks played the Boston Celtics in all four of their trips to the NBA Finals. The Hawks moved to Atlanta on May 3, 1968, and became the Atlanta Hawks, when Kerner sold the franchise to Thomas Cousins and former Georgia governor Carl Sanders. The ownership of the team includes billionaire James Cox Chambers.

The Hawks currently own the second-longest drought (behind the Sacramento Kings) of not winning an NBA championship at 67 seasons. The franchise's lone NBA championship, as well as all four NBA Finals appearances, occurred when the team was based in St. Louis. Meanwhile, they went 48 years without advancing past the second round of the playoffs in any format, until finally breaking through in 2015. The Hawks are one of only four NBA teams that have qualified to play in the NBA playoffs in 10 consecutive seasons in the 21st century. They achieved this feat between 2008 and 2017.

In the 2024 NBA draft, the Atlanta Hawks selected Zaccharie Risacher with the first overall pick, their first since 1975.

== History ==
=== 1946–1953: Buffalo, Tri-Cities, and Milwaukee ===
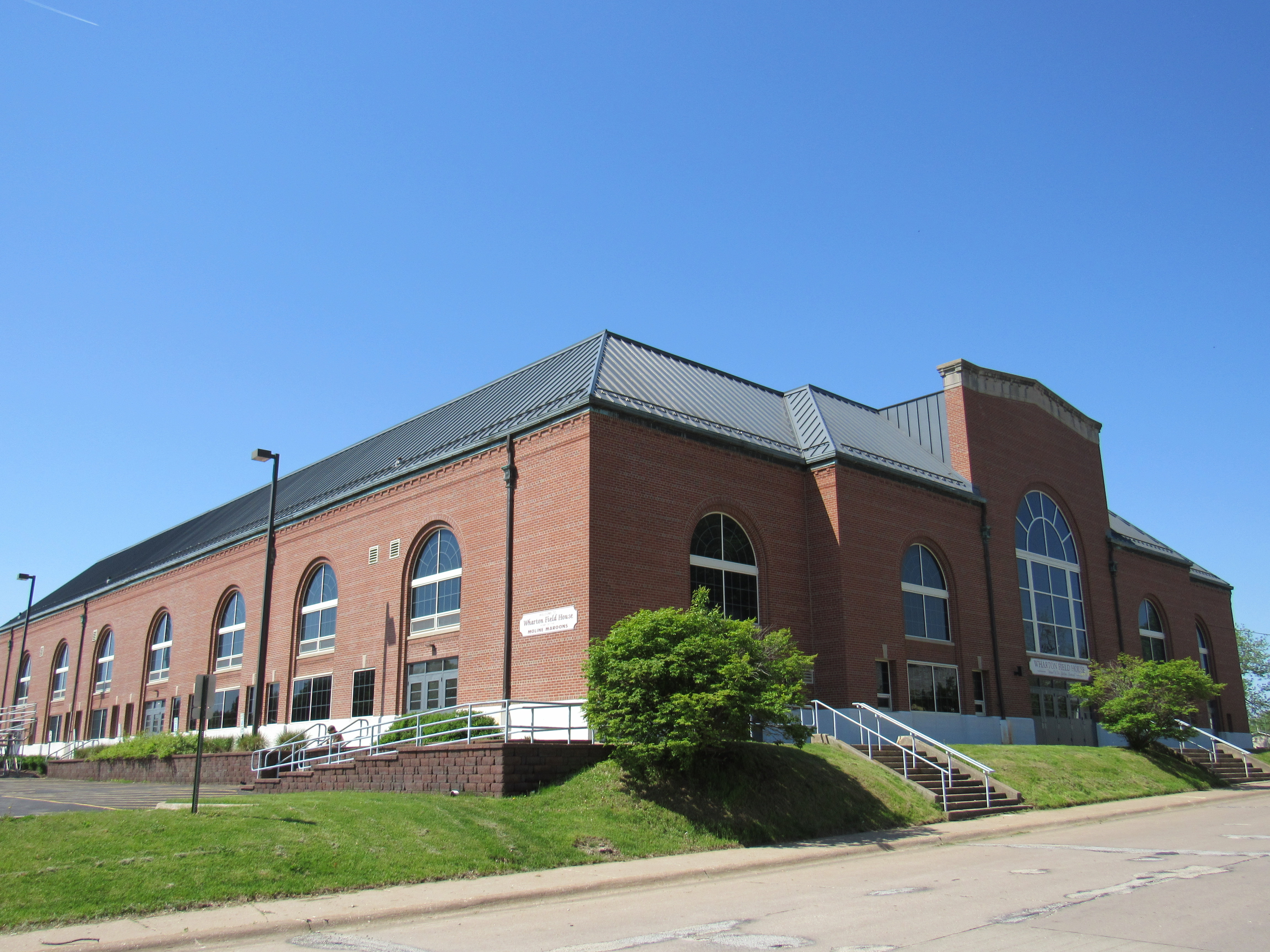
Wharton Field House in Moline, Illinois

The origins of the Atlanta Hawks can be traced back to the Buffalo Bisons franchise, which was founded in 1946. The Bisons were a member of the National Basketball League (NBL), and played their games at the Buffalo Memorial Auditorium. The club was organized by Leo Ferris and the Erie County American Legion and was coached by Nat Hickey. Their first game, which was a 50–39 victory over the Syracuse Nationals, was played on November 8, 1946. On the team was William "Pop" Gates, who, along with William "Dolly" King, was one of the first two African-American players in the NBL. The team, which needed to draw 3,600 fans per game to break even, struggled to draw even 1,000 fans per game to the Auditorium. The franchise lasted only 38 days (13 games) in Buffalo when, on December 25, 1946, Leo Ferris, the team's general manager and co-owner, announced that the team would be moving to Moline, Illinois, which at that time was part of an area then known as the "Tri-Cities": Moline, Illinois, Rock Island, Illinois, and Davenport, Iowa. In addition to the city of Moline for the Tri-Cities representation, the Bisons franchise also considered the bigger cities of Minneapolis and Milwaukee as potential options for them to move to instead, with the game deciding their new location being a December 6, 1946 game in Moline that drew in 4,000 people for a neutral match between the Chicago American Gears and Syracuse Nationals (now Philadelphia 76ers).

Upon moving to Moline, the team was renamed the Tri-Cities Blackhawks, and played their home games at Wharton Field House, a 6,000-seat arena in Moline. During the team's existence as the Blackhawks, the team had also been referred to as both the Tri-City Blackhawks and Quad-City Blackhawks alongside the more official Tri-Cities Blackhawks. The team featured guard/forward and coach Nat Hickey, and was owned by Leo Ferris and Ben Kerner. Pop Gates remained on the Blackhawks roster, and finished second on the team in scoring behind future 1949 NBL MVP Don Otten. A Naismith Basketball Hall of Fame member, Gates helped to integrate the league and later became the first African-American coach in a major sports league, coaching Dayton in 1948.

In 1949, the Blackhawks became one of the National Basketball Association's 17 original teams after a merger of the 12-year-old NBL and the three-year-old Basketball Association of America (BAA). They reached the playoffs in the NBA's inaugural year under the leadership of coach Red Auerbach. The following season, they drafted three-time All-American Bob Cousy, but they were unable to reach a deal and traded him to the Chicago Stags (who would later surrender him in a dispersal draft to the Boston Celtics when the Stags folded). The Blackhawks finished last in the Western Division and missed the playoffs. By then, it was obvious that the Tri-Cities area was too small to support an NBA team. After the season, the franchise moved to Milwaukee, and became the Milwaukee Hawks.

=== 1954–1965: St. Louis and the Bob Pettit era ===
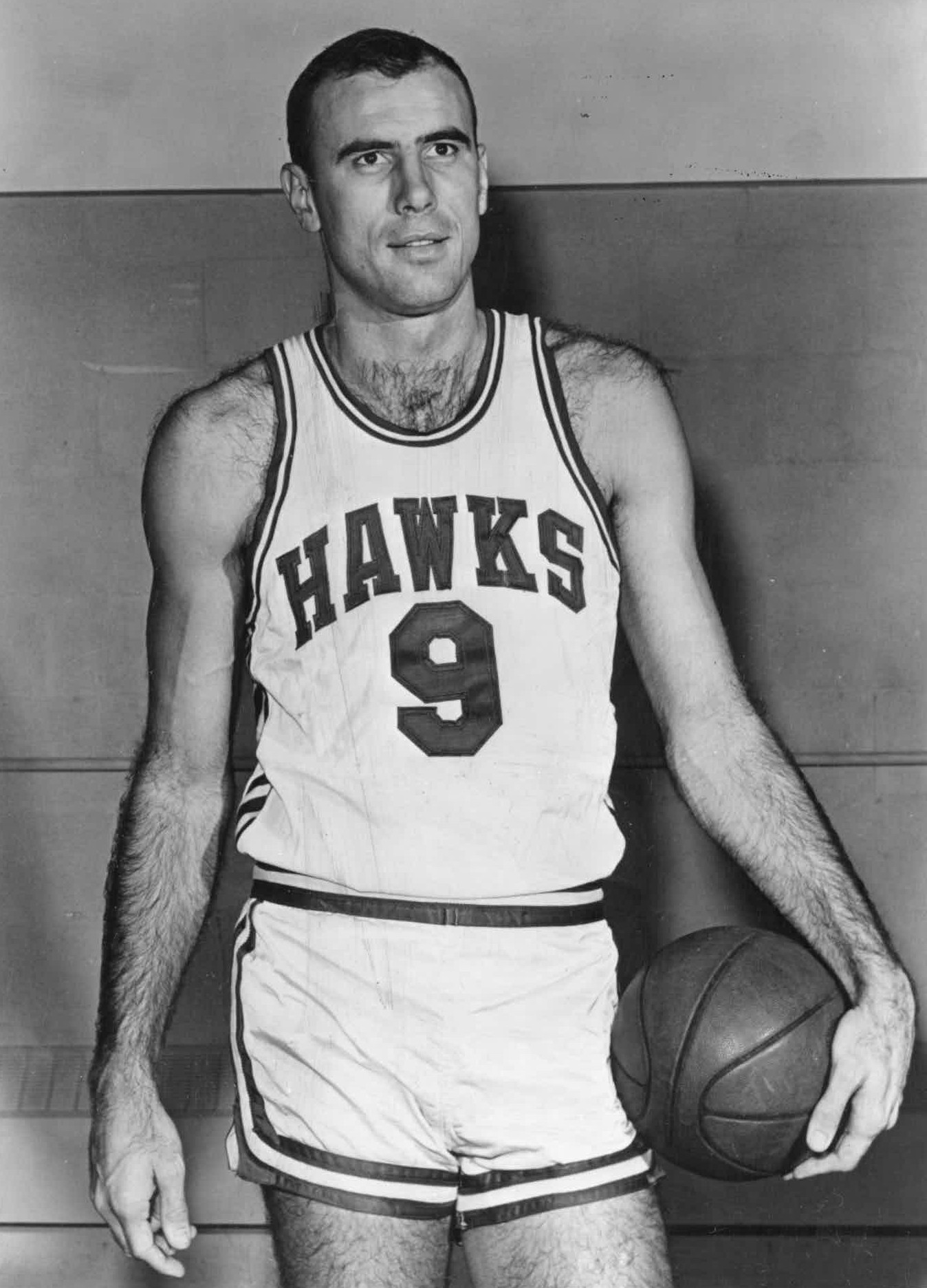
Bob Pettit

In 1954, the Hawks drafted Bob Pettit, a future NBA MVP. Despite this, the Hawks were one of the league's worst teams, and in 1955 the Hawks moved, this time to St. Louis, Milwaukee's rival in the beer industry, and became the St. Louis Hawks. Milwaukee would remain without an NBA team until 1968 when the Milwaukee Bucks made their debut.

In 1956, Bob Pettit captured the league's first official Most Valuable Player award, and the St. Louis Hawks drafted Bill Russell in the first round (second overall pick). They immediately traded Russell to the Boston Celtics for Cliff Hagan and Ed Macauley, both Hall of Fame members.

In 1957, the Hawks finished four games under .500. However, the Western Division was extremely weak that year; no team in the division had a winning record. They won the division title and a bye to the division finals after defeating the Minneapolis Lakers and Fort Wayne Pistons in one-game tiebreakers. They then defeated the Lakers in the division finals to advance to the NBA Finals, losing to the Boston Celtics in a double-overtime thriller in game seven.

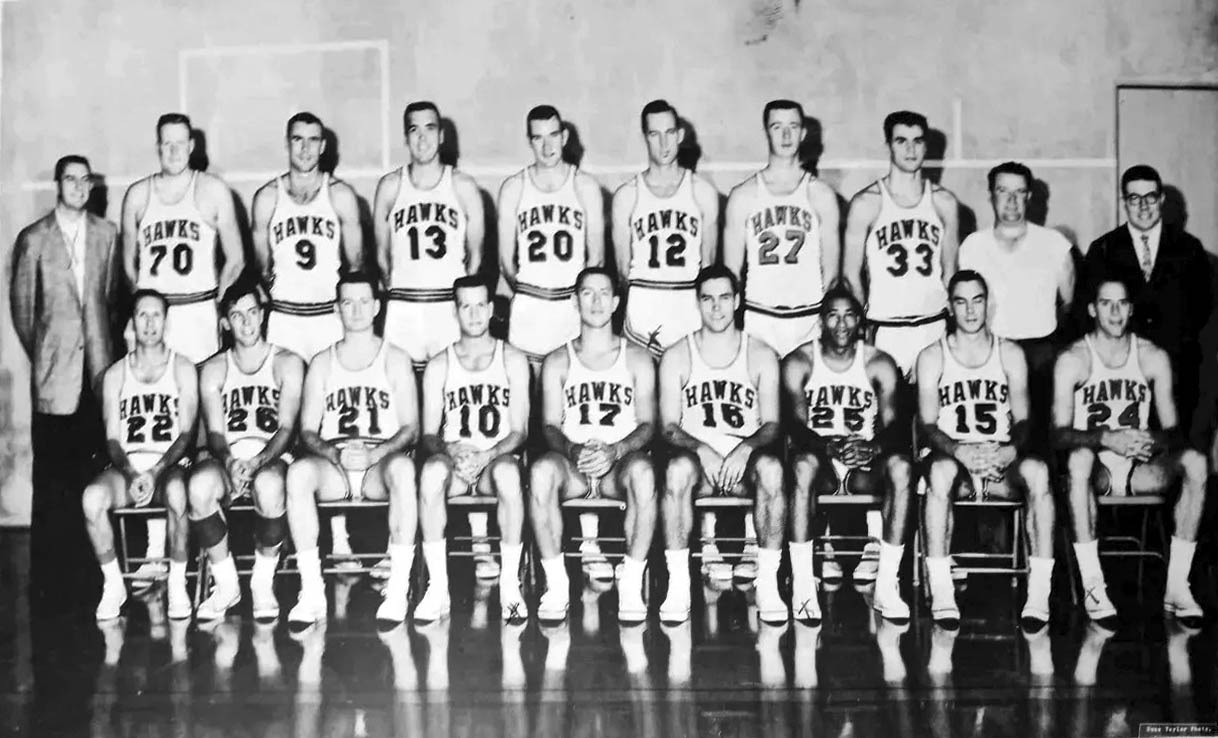
The St. Louis team that won the 1957–58 championship

In 1958, after tallying their first winning record, they again advanced to the NBA Finals, where they avenged their defeat against the Celtics from the previous year, winning the series 4–2 and giving the Hawks their first and only NBA championship. Bob Pettit scored 50 points in the final game of the series. The following season Bob Pettit led the Hawks to a Western Division-best 49–23 record, helping him capture his second MVP award.

The Hawks remained one of the NBA's premier teams for the next decade. In 1960, under coach Ed Macauley, the team advanced to the NBA Finals, but lost to the Celtics in another game seven thriller. The following year, with the acquisition of rookie Lenny Wilkens, the Hawks repeated their success, but met the Celtics in the 1961 NBA Finals again and lost in five games. They would remain contenders for most of the 1960s, advancing deep into the playoffs and also capturing several division titles.

=== 1965–1976: Move to Atlanta ===
Despite the success, Kerner became weary of the Hawks' longtime home, Kiel Auditorium. The 33-year-old arena seated only 10,000 and was starting to show its age. The Hawks occasionally played at the larger St. Louis Arena, mostly against popular opponents, but Kerner was not willing to move the team there full-time due to deferred maintenance that would not be addressed until 1967, when it was finally renovated to accommodate the arrival of the National Hockey League's (NHL) St. Louis Blues. Kerner also did not want to be a tenant to the city and move to the renovated arena full-time, wishing to have his own building in order to retain all revenue, but was continually rebuffed by St. Louis regarding his demands. In early 1967, Kerner briefly put the Hawks up for sale. One of the bidders was a New Orleans group led by future talk show host Morton Downey Jr.. The deal would collapse, and after one month, the team was taken back off the market.

Unable to resolve the arena situation, on May 3, 1968, Kerner sold the Hawks to Atlanta real estate developer Tom Cousins and former Georgia governor Carl Sanders, which would be subject to league approval. When the deal was approved, the new owners moved the team to Atlanta to begin play for the 1968–69 season. While a new arena was being constructed, the team spent its first four seasons playing at Alexander Memorial Coliseum on the campus of Georgia Tech, winning their first division title in the 1969–70 season with a 48–34 (.585) record in the Western Division. Cousins' firm soon developed the Omni Coliseum, a 16,500-seat arena in downtown Atlanta, for the Hawks and the NHL's expansion Atlanta Flames ice hockey franchise, which opened for the 1972–73 season as the first phase of a massive sports, office, hotel, and retail complex, most of which is now the CNN Center. The team would also unite its color scheme with that of the Flames, replacing a transitional two-season green and blue color scheme in favor of white, gold, and red. A simplified version of the team's logo was also introduced, retaining the hawk head silhouette inside a circle.

The years after the move showcased a talented Hawks team, including Pete Maravich and Lou Hudson. However, after this period of success, the team experienced some years of rebuilding. Despite appearing to be moving in the right direction when they ended up with the first and third picks overall in the 1975 NBA draft, the players selected with those two picks, David Thompson of North Carolina State and Marvin Webster of Morgan State, both signed with the Denver Nuggets of the American Basketball Association (ABA) and never played for the Hawks.

=== 1977–1982: Ted Turner purchases team ===
Cable network entrepreneur and Atlanta Braves owner Ted Turner bought the team in 1977 and hired Hubie Brown to become head coach. The Hawks were the only NBA team in the Deep South, just as the Atlanta Braves were the only Major League Baseball team in the region for many years to come. Turner's ownership was instrumental in keeping both teams in the region. Brown won coach of the year in 1978. In the 1979–80 season, the Hawks finished with a 50–32 record and won the Central Division, their first as a member of the Central Division and second in the city of Atlanta. The next season, the Hawks got off to a 4–0 start, then lost 13 of the next 14 games and with 3 games left in the season, the Hawks fired head coach Hubie Brown en route to the team's 31–51 record.

=== 1982–1994: Dominique Wilkins era ===
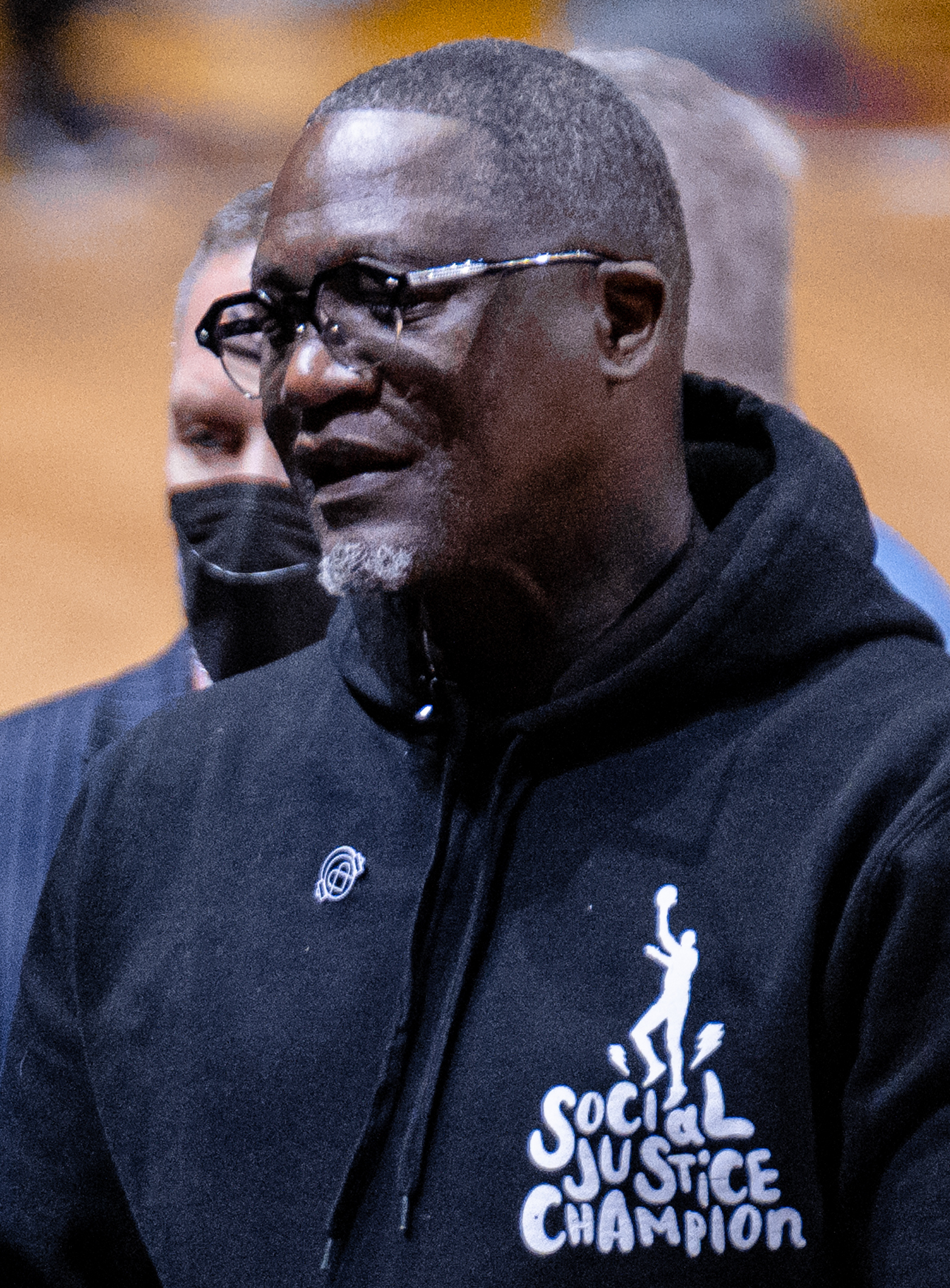
Dominique Wilkins (shown in 2022)

In 1982, the franchise acquired superstar Dominique Wilkins (a University of Georgia alumnus) and promoted Mike Fratello to head coach a year later. Due to sagging attendance, 12 home games during the 1984–85 season were played at the Lakefront Arena in New Orleans, Louisiana. The New Orleans games were paid for by Barry Mendelson for $1.2 million with the Hawks going 6–6 in Louisiana. Wilkins won the Slam Dunk Contest in 1985 and 1990, engaging in an iconic rivalry with Michael Jordan. Spud Webb won the Slam Dunk Contest and Fratello won the Coach of the Year Award in 1986.

From 1985 to 1989, the Hawks were among the league's elite, winning 50 games or more each season. They won a division title in 1986–87 going 57–25 which was a franchise record that would last until the 2014–15 season. However, the team could not advance past the conference semifinals, losing to the eventual Eastern Conference (and in some years, NBA) champions Boston and Detroit. The Hawks drafted Stacey Augmon with their ninth overall pick in the 1991 NBA draft, who would make the All-Rookie First Team. However, Wilkins had a season-ending injury in the middle of the season, and without him, the Hawks were unable to make it to the playoffs. In 1992, the Hawks acquired guard Mookie Blaylock from the New Jersey Nets; he would spend seven years of his career as a Hawk, leading them in career steals and three-point field goals while earning an All-Star appearance in 1994. After seasons of mediocrity, Lenny Wilkens was hired as head coach in 1993. In 1993–94, the Hawks won 57 games, tying a team record. They also won a fourth division title in Atlanta, and third in the Central Division. Coach Wilkens was named Coach of the Year for his work with the team. However, the team fell short again in the playoffs, losing to the fifth-seeded Indiana Pacers in the Eastern semis in six games. The season was also marred by the trading of Dominique Wilkins, who remains the franchise's all-time leading scorer, to the Los Angeles Clippers for Danny Manning, who quickly left via free agency to the Phoenix Suns after the season ended. On March 6, 2015, Dominique Wilkins received a statue in front of Philips Arena.

=== 1994–1996: Post-Wilkins ===
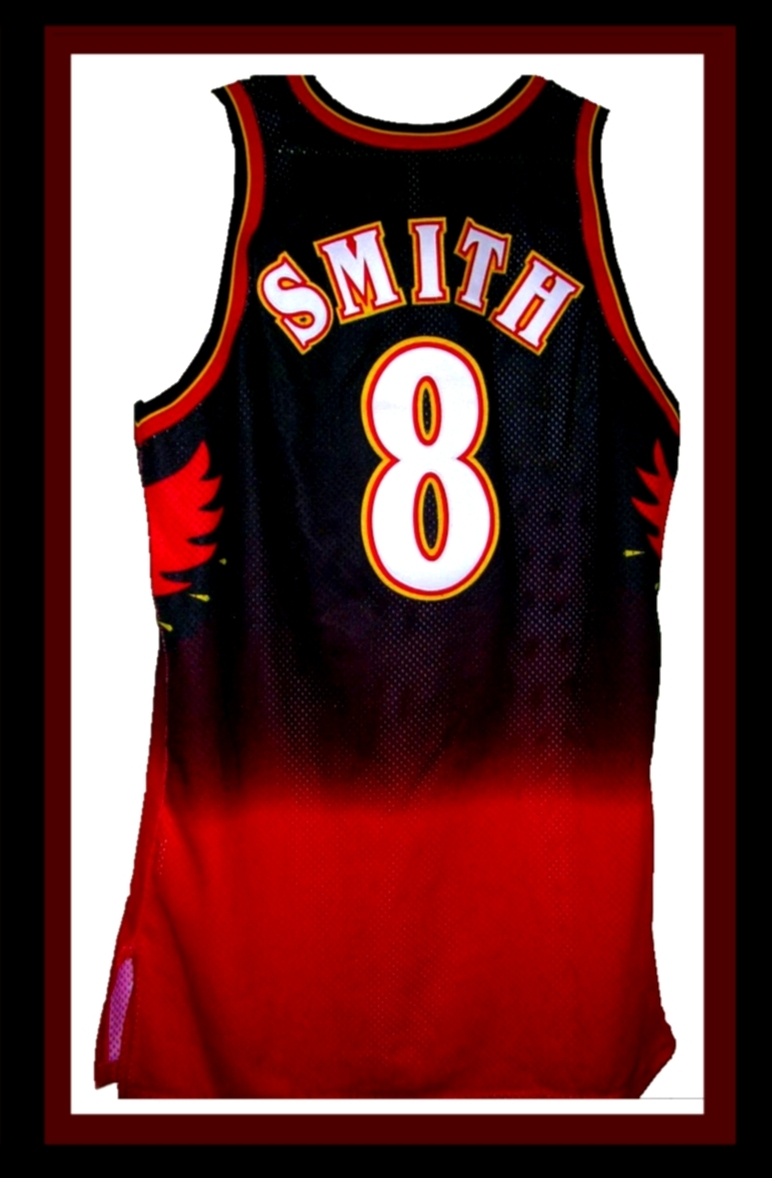
Steve Smith was one of the Hawks' cornerstone players during the mid-to-late 1990s, helping lead Atlanta to three conference semifinals.

At the beginning of the 1994–95 season, the Hawks traded forward Kevin Willis to the Miami Heat for Steve Smith and Grant Long. During the season, coach Wilkens broke the record (previously held by Red Auerbach) for most victories by an NBA head coach with victory number 939. They ended up fifth in the Central Division with a 42–40 record and would be swept by the Indiana Pacers in the first round of the playoffs.

=== 1996–2001: Dikembe Mutombo era ===
During the off-season, shot-blocking All-Star center Dikembe Mutombo signed a 5-year, $55 million deal with the Hawks.

The Hawks finished the 1995–96 season with a 46–36 record, fourth in the Central Division. Midway through the season, they acquired Christian Laettner from the Minnesota Timberwolves; Laettner would get an All-Star appearance in 1997. They upset the third-seeded Pacers in the first round in five games; however, lost in five games to the Orlando Magic in the semifinals.

Around this time, it was decided that the Omni should be replaced by a new arena. The Omni was designed with weathering steel that was intended to rust into a seal around the arena so it could last for decades. However, the designers and architects did not reckon on Atlanta's humid subtropical climate. As a result, it never stopped rusting, and looked somewhat dated despite being 25 years old. When Turner won an NHL franchise, the Atlanta Thrashers, one condition was that a new arena had to be in place before the new team took the ice for the first time, as The Omni was unusable even for temporary use. Eventually, it was decided that The Omni would be demolished and a new arena for the Hawks and the expansion NHL Thrashers would be built on the same area. After the 1997 playoffs, the Hawks moved back to Georgia Tech's Alexander Memorial Coliseum, with the Georgia Dome used for larger-capacity games, until Philips Arena opened before the 1999–2000 season.

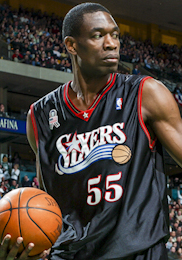
Dikembe Mutombo (shown in 2001) was the face of the Hawks during the mid to late 90s

The Hawks had two 50-plus win seasons in 1996–97 (56–26) and 1997–98 (50–32); center Dikembe Mutombo won defensive player of the year back to back. In the first round of the 1997 NBA playoffs, the Hawks defeated the Detroit Pistons in five games, but lost in five games in the second round to the defending champs Chicago Bulls. Game 4, an 89–80 loss, was the last game at The Omni. In 1997–98, forward Alan Henderson won Most Improved Player award. The Hawks lost in four games in the first round of the 1998 playoffs to the Charlotte Hornets. The Hawks ended with 31 wins in the lockout-shortened 1998–99 season. In the first round they defeated the Pistons in five games, but were swept in the second round by the eighth-seeded New York Knicks.

In the 1999–2000 season, their first season at Philips Arena, the Hawks traded Steve Smith to Portland for Isaiah Rider and Jim Jackson, and sent Mookie Blaylock and a first-round draft pick to the Golden State Warriors for Bimbo Coles and a first-round draft pick. Smith and Blaylock had been among the Hawks' most popular players during the 1990s; Smith had recently received the J. Walter Kennedy Citizenship Award for his charitable endeavors and been picked for in the 1998 NBA All-Star Game. By contrast, Rider had a history of behavioral problems both on and off the court; it continued in Atlanta. Rider missed the first day of training camp and was late for two other games. After reports that he smoked marijuana in an Orlando hotel room during a January road trip, the league demanded that he attend drug counseling, and fined him a total of $200,000 until he agreed to go. When he showed up late for a March game, the Hawks released him. The Smith/Rider trade sent the Hawks into a downward spiral. After only missing the playoffs four times since 1977, they fell to seventh place in the Central Division with a 28–54 record; they would not return to the playoffs for eight years.

=== 2001–2005: Post-Mutombo and struggles ===
Point guard Jason Terry became the team's scoring leader during the 2000–01 season, with 19.7 ppg. After the All-Star break, the Hawks traded Mutombo to the Philadelphia 76ers for Theo Ratliff, Toni Kukoč, and Nazr Mohammed. Ratliff was injured and did not play with the Hawks until next season. They ended the season with a 25–57 record. In 2001, the Hawks drafted Spanish star Pau Gasol third, but his rights were ceded to the Memphis Grizzlies in a trade involving Shareef Abdur-Rahim. Abdur-Rahim became the team's scoring leader, and made his only All-Star appearance in 2002. The team ended up 33–49 for the 2001–02 season. The Hawks sent Kukoc to the Milwaukee Bucks for All-Star Glenn Robinson in 2002, Robinson lead the team with 20.8 ppg. But the Hawks still failed to make the playoffs for the 2002–03 season, finishing with a 35–47 record.

In February 2004, the Hawks had NBA All-Star Rasheed Wallace play one game for the team. Wallace was traded from Portland to the Hawks along with Wesley Person for Abdur-Rahim, Ratliff, and Dan Dickau. In his lone game for the Hawks, Wallace scored 20 points, had 6 rebounds, 5 blocks, 2 assists and a steal in a loss to the New Jersey Nets. After the game he was dealt to the Detroit Pistons in a three-way trade with the Boston Celtics. In turn, Detroit sent guard Bob Sura, center Željko Rebrača, and a first-round draft pick to the Hawks. The Boston Celtics also sent forward Chris Mills to Atlanta to complete the deal, but Mills never played in a Hawks uniform. The Hawks ended their 2003–04 season with a 28–54 record. In 2003, Atlanta hosted the All-Star Game, the last an Eastern Conference team would host for the next nine years.

==== Atlanta Spirit LLC's ownership ====
On March 31, 2004, the team was sold to a group of executives by the name of Atlanta Spirit LLC by Time Warner (who inherited the Hawks, Braves and Thrashers upon its merger with Turner Broadcasting in 1996). During the off-season, the Hawks sent Jason Terry, Alan Henderson, and a future first-round draft pick to the Dallas Mavericks for Antoine Walker and Tony Delk. After the change in ownership, the Hawks still struggled. In the 2004–05 season, the Hawks were the league's worst team with a mere 13 victories (five fewer than even the expansion Charlotte Bobcats and the struggling New Orleans Hornets). It was also the year Josh Smith won the 2005 Slam Dunk Contest.

=== 2005–2012: Joe Johnson era ===
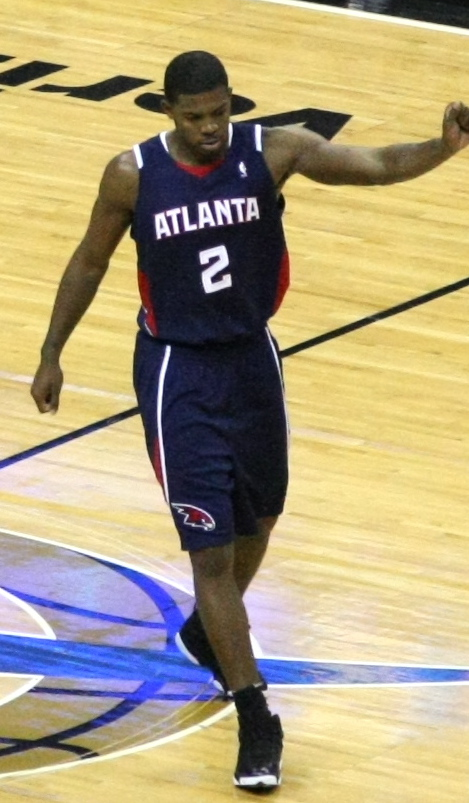
In 2005, the Hawks acquired seven-time NBA All-Star Joe Johnson.

In the summer of 2005, the Hawks completed a sign-and-trade deal with the Phoenix Suns to acquire Joe Johnson in return for Boris Diaw and two future 1st-round picks. They also signed Zaza Pachulia from the Milwaukee Bucks. These changes occurred after an apparent power struggle between the owners for nearly three weeks.

Despite their league-worst record the previous season, the Hawks landed just the number-two pick in the 2005 NBA draft lottery (the first pick went to the Milwaukee Bucks). They selected Marvin Williams of North Carolina. In the 2006 draft, the Hawks selected Duke star Shelden Williams with the fifth overall pick.

Hope and redemption appeared to be on the horizon for the Hawks beginning in 2007. With the third pick of the NBA draft, they selected Al Horford. Horford nearly averaged a double-double during his rookie season, and was the only unanimous selection to the All-Rookie First Team as well as being runner-up for Rookie of the Year honors. The season started with a victory against the Dallas Mavericks 101–94, sending hope to Hawks fans. The last time they won a season opener was in 1998, also the last time they made the playoffs. For the 2007–08 season, the Atlanta Hawks updated the logos and uniforms that saw navy blue become the primary color, with red relegated to trim color status. This marked the first time in team history that they had used navy blue as one of their colors.

A mid-season trade for point guard Mike Bibby boosted the Hawks' playoff hopes. At the time of the trade the Hawks were 22–28; afterwards, they won 15 of their last 32 games to finish 37–45. Although they finished with a losing record, they managed to make the playoffs for the first time since 1999. In the playoffs the Hawks started to show improvement, pushing the eventual NBA Champions, Boston Celtics, to a Game 7 before losing in Boston. The Hawks won all three games at Philips Arena, which hosted its first playoff games and earned its first sellout.

Uniforms from 2007 to 2015. In 2014, the shorts logo changed to the team's updated "Pac-Man" logo.

The 2008–09 season saw the Hawks win 47 games, their first winning season since 1999. With almost an intact lineup from the previous year, the Hawks manage to take a step forward in their development. Again they were pushed to a Game 7 in the first round but capitalized on home-court advantage earning their first playoff series win since 1999 against the Miami Heat. The Hawks were swept by the Cleveland Cavaliers 4–0 in the conference semifinals.

The 2009–10 season saw the Hawks improve further, winning 53 games, their first 50-win season since 1997–98. Al Horford earned his first All-Star selection, and along with Joe Johnson, this marked the first time since 1998 that the Hawks sent two players to the All-Star Game. The playoffs, however, were a reprise from the previous year. They won a hard-fought seven-game series against the Milwaukee Bucks, but they were swept by the Orlando Magic in the second round, with every game a one-sided contest. After the season, the Hawks dismissed head coach Mike Woodson and was replaced by Larry Drew.

The Hawks took a step back in the 2010–11 season, finishing with 44 wins, even though Horford and Johnson were named to the All-Star team. In mid-season the Hawks traded Mike Bibby to the Washington Wizards for Kirk Hinrich, in hopes of bringing a defensive guard to replace the defensively liable Bibby. The Hawks finished the season losing their final six games. In the playoffs the Hawks beat the Magic in six games; however, they subsequently lost to the Chicago Bulls in the Eastern Conference semifinals in six games.

In August 2011, it was announced that California-based businessman Alex Meruelo was buying a majority stake of the Hawks, but in November he backed out of his intentions.

In December 2011, the Hawks signed Tracy McGrady, Jerry Stackhouse, Jason Collins, Vladimir Radmanovic, Jannero Pargo, and Willie Green. They also picked up rookies Donald Sloan and 27-year-old Ivan Johnson. Sloan was waived a month later.

The Hawks finished the 2011–12 season with the fourth-best record in the Eastern Conference with 40 wins, clinching the playoffs for the fifth straight season. However, the Hawks would be eliminated in the first round by the Boston Celtics in six games, ending the Hawks' three-year streak of advancing to the second round.

=== 2012–2013: Roster turnover ===
On June 25, 2012, the Hawks hired San Antonio Spurs Vice President of Basketball Operations Danny Ferry as President of Basketball Operations and General Manager. During the 2012 NBA draft, the Hawks chose guard John Jenkins with the 23rd pick and power forward Mike Scott with the 43rd pick. On July 2, 2012, the Hawks traded leading scorer and All-Star Joe Johnson to the Brooklyn Nets for Jordan Farmar, Anthony Morrow, DeShawn Stevenson, Jordan Williams and Johan Petro, as well as a 2013 first-round pick. That same day, the Hawks traded small forward Marvin Williams to the Utah Jazz for point guard Devin Harris.

On July 10, 2012, the Hawks signed guard Lou Williams.

On January 21, 2013, following Lou Williams' season-ending injury in a game against the Brooklyn Nets, the Hawks signed guard Jannero Pargo to a 10-day contract.

On February 21, 2013, the Hawks traded Morrow to the Dallas Mavericks for Dahntay Jones. That same day, the Hawks traded a future 2nd-round pick to the Golden State Warriors in exchange for Jeremy Tyler, who was waived 15 days later.

The Hawks ended the 2012–13 season with a 44–38 record, making a playoff appearance for the sixth straight season. However, they were eliminated by the Indiana Pacers in six games in the first round. By the end of the off-season, every player involved in the Johnson and Williams trades just a year earlier were either waived or not brought back. The 2013 free agency period also marked the end of the Josh Smith era for Atlanta as he signed a contract with the Detroit Pistons. Longtime Hawk Zaza Pachulia moved on as well and signed with the Milwaukee Bucks. With half the roster gone, 2012–13 proved to be a roster turnover year, paving a path to success for Mike Budenholzer.

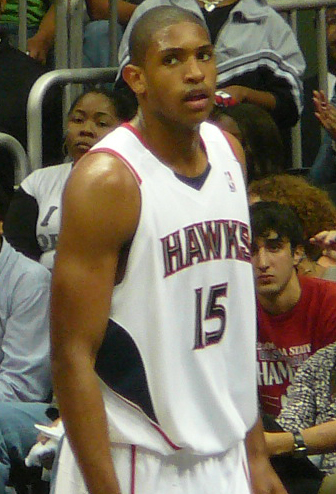
Al Horford was a 4 Time All-Star with the Hawks

=== 2013–2018: Mike Budenholzer era ===
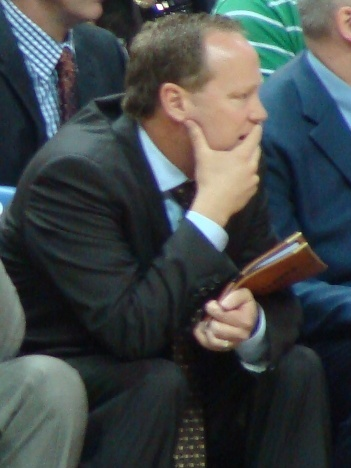
Mike Budenholzer coached the team to 60 wins in the 2014–15 season, a franchise record

On May 28, 2013, the Hawks hired San Antonio Spurs assistant coach Mike Budenholzer as the new head coach.

The Hawks entered the 2013 NBA draft with four draft picks. They drafted point guards Dennis Schröder (17th pick) and Shane Larkin (18th pick). They also chose point guard Raulzinho Neto with the 47th pick and small forward James Ennis with the 50th pick. However, the Hawks traded Larkin to the Dallas Mavericks for the draft rights of Mike Muscala and Lucas Nogueira (originally drafted by the Boston Celtics), as well as guard Jared Cunningham. They also traded Ennis's draft rights to the Miami Heat and Neto's to the Utah Jazz for a future second-round pick. The Hawks brought back Kyle Korver with a four-year, $24 million deal and signed power forward Paul Millsap to a two-year, $19 million deal.

On December 26, 2013, Horford tore his right pectoral muscle, and on December 30, the Hawks announced that he would undergo surgery the next day and would miss the rest of the season. The Hawks finished 38–44, their first losing season since 2008. However, due to the weakness of the Eastern Conference, they finished as the 8th seed in the playoffs, and just like 2008, the Hawks would not go down easy, as they took the top-seeded Pacers to 7 games in before a 92–80 loss in game 7.

On May 1, 2014, the Hawks unveiled a new secondary logo, which is a modernized version of the 1972–95 "Pac-Man" logo. On July 15, 2014, they acquired defensive specialist Thabo Sefolosha from the Oklahoma City Thunder. On September 7, 2014, Bruce Levenson announced he would sell his share of the team, after self-reporting an inappropriate email he sent in 2012. Some in the African American sports community have defended Levenson, namely Jason Whitlock and Kareem Abdul-Jabbar, commenting that Levenson's email had no racist intent, but was motivated by valid business concerns.

On January 2, 2015, The Atlanta Journal-Constitution reported that the remaining minority owners of Atlanta Hawks, LLC would join Levenson, effectively putting the entire franchise for sale. The sale of the team as well as the operating rights to Philips Arena was handled by Goldman Sachs and Inner Circle Sports LLC. The NBA has stated that the Hawks would remain in Atlanta as a condition of their sale. Additionally, Atlanta mayor Kasim Reed stated that the city might offer incentives for a prospective owner to keep the Hawks in Atlanta for another 30 years. On April 22, 2015, Atlanta Spirit reached a tentative agreement to sell the franchise to a group led by billionaire Tony Ressler (with Grant Hill, Steven Price, Rick Schnall, Sara Blakely, Jesse Itzler and Ressler's wife Jami Gertz holding minority stakes) for $850 million; the sale was approved by the NBA Board of Governors on June 24, 2015.

On January 31, 2015, the Hawks became the first NBA team to go 17–0 in a calendar month by beating Portland. The 2015 All-Star Game consisted of four Hawks All-Stars including Jeff Teague, Paul Millsap, Kyle Korver, and Al Horford. On March 9, Kyle Korver and DeMarre Carroll each scored 20 points to help the Hawks become the first NBA team to 50 wins in 2014–15, scoring a season-high in a 130–105 win over the Sacramento Kings. The Hawks also set a franchise record by going 20-of-36 for three-pointers, breaking the mark of 19 set against the Dallas Mavericks on December 17, 1996. On March 20, 2015, the Hawks clinched their first division title in over two decades and became the first team not based in Florida to win the NBA's Southeast Division; one week later, with a win over Miami as well as a Cleveland's loss to Brooklyn, the Hawks clinched the top seed in the Eastern Conference for the 2015 playoffs. The team finished a franchise-best 60–22.

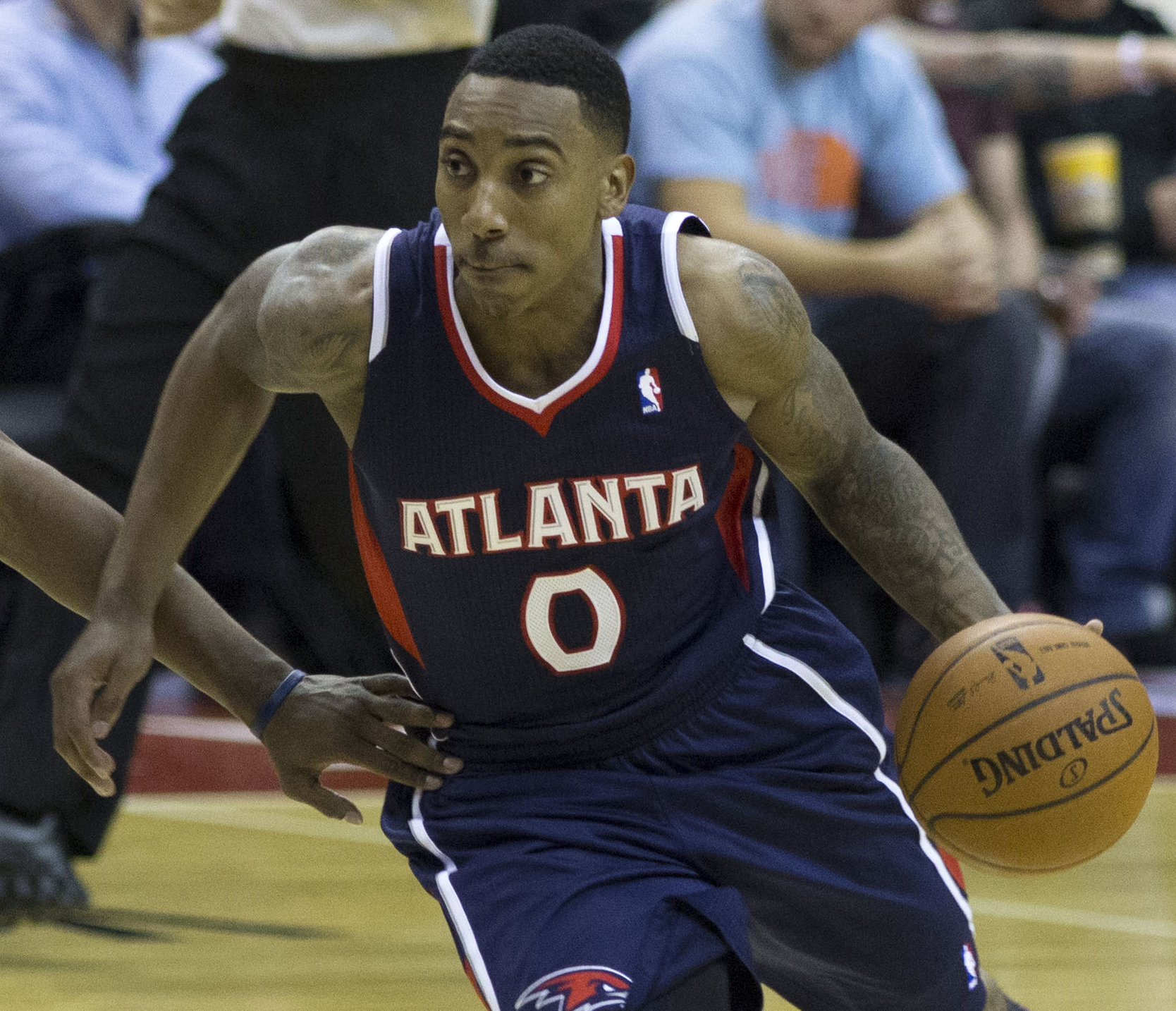
Jeff Teague was an NBA All Star in 2015 along with three other Hawks players that year (Horford, Millsap, Korver)

In the first round, the Hawks defeated the Brooklyn Nets in six games. The Hawks then advanced to the conference semifinals to face the Washington Wizards, also defeating them in six games. It was the first time they had advanced past the second round since 1967, their second-last year in St. Louis. The Hawks advanced to the conference finals for the first time in franchise history, when they lost in four games to the Cleveland Cavaliers.

On June 22, 2016, the Hawks traded Jeff Teague to Indiana in a three-team deal, that would give Utah's 12th pick in the 2016 NBA draft to the Hawks. On July 8, 2016, Horford signed a four-year, $113 million contract with the Boston Celtics. On July 12, 2016, Dwight Howard agreed to return home to Atlanta on a three-year, $70 million contract with the Hawks. The Hawks finished the season with a 43–39 record, good enough for the fifth seed. They lost in the first round to the Washington Wizards in six games.

On June 20, 2017, Howard was traded, along with the 31st overall pick in the 2017 NBA draft, to the Charlotte Hornets in exchange for Marco Bellinelli, Miles Plumlee, and the 41st overall pick in the same draft. Two days later, the Hawks selected Wake Forest power forward John Collins with the 19th overall pick. On July 13, 2017, Paul Millsap left the Hawks by signing a multi-year deal with the Denver Nuggets.

The loss of Howard and Millsap proved insurmountable for the rebuilding Hawks as they finished with a 24–58 record in the 2017–18 season, last in the Eastern Conference, and missed the playoffs for the first time since the 2006–07 season. On April 25, 2018, the Hawks and head coach Budenholzer had mutually decided to part ways. Budenholzer later signed a deal to coach the Milwaukee Bucks.

=== 2018–2026: Trae Young era ===
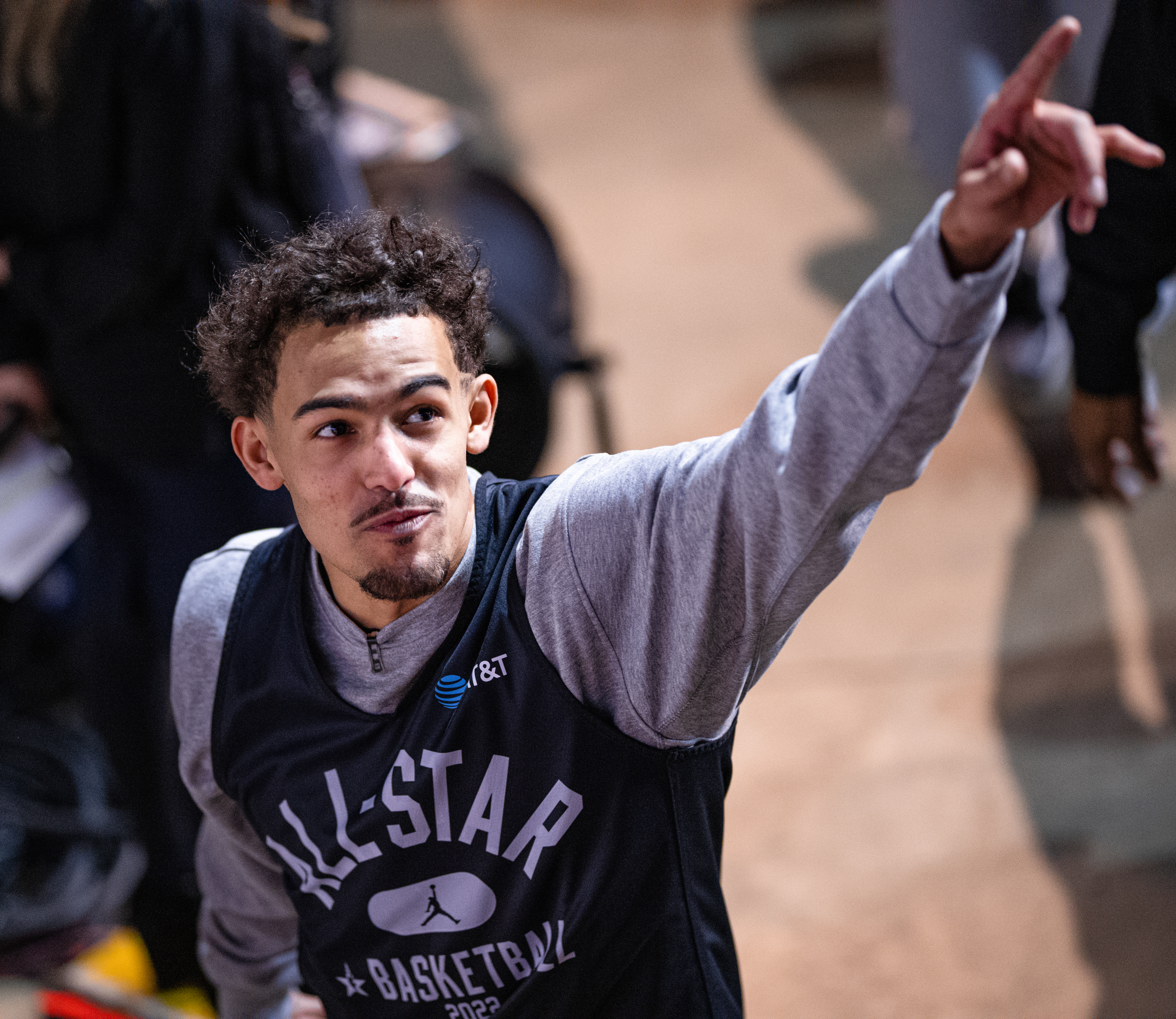
Trae Young in 2022

On May 11, 2018, Lloyd Pierce was hired by the Atlanta Hawks as head coach. On June 21, the Hawks selected Luka Dončić with the third overall pick in the 2018 NBA draft and immediately traded him to the Dallas Mavericks for a 2019 protected first-round pick and the draft rights to Trae Young. The Atlanta Hawks also selected Kevin Huerter with the 19th pick and Omari Spellman with the 30th pick of the 2018 NBA draft. It was speculated that the Hawks general manager, Travis Schlenk, was following the same plan for a rebuild that he had success with in Golden State.

In July 2018, the Hawks acquired Jeremy Lin, and traded Dennis Schröder, after he demanded to be traded. Carmelo Anthony was acquired in the trade involving Schröder, but was later waived through a buyout. During the off-season, the team signed Vince Carter and Alex Len among other players. In February 2019, Lin was bought out, and eventually signed with the Toronto Raptors.

In the 2019 NBA Draft, the Atlanta Hawks obtained DeAndre Hunter who was drafted with the 4th pick. They also used the 10th pick, that they acquired when they traded Luka Dončić for Trae Young, to acquire Cam Reddish.

On January 23, 2020, Trae Young was selected to his first All-Star Game. He was voted in as a starter and was the first Hawks player to start in an All-Star Game since Dikembe Mutombo in 1998. On February 4, 2020, the Hawks were involved in a four team trade in which they acquired Clint Capela and Nenê. Capela was healing from a foot injury at the time and did not play for that entire season, which was cut short due to the NBA's COVID-19 protocols. Nenê was waived by the Hawks on February 6, 2020. Carter retired after the season after spending a record 22 seasons in the NBA.

==== 2020–21: Trip to the conference finals ====
For the 2020–21 season, the Atlanta Hawks made moves to upgrade their roster. They signed two veteran players – wing Bogdan Bogdanović and power forward Danilo Gallinari – and Rajon Rondo and Kris Dunn to help in the backcourt.

In March 2021, head coach Pierce was fired after the team's 14–20 start to the season and Nate McMillan was named interim head coach. After McMillan took over head coaching duties, the Hawks immediately posted an eight-game win streak, putting them firmly in playoff contention. They went 27–11 under McMillen to finish 41–31, fifth-best in the Eastern Conference, and become Southeast Division champions.

In the playoffs, they defeated the fourth-seeded Knicks before upsetting the top-seeded 76ers to reach the conference finals, only the second time in 54 years that the franchise had advanced past the second round. They lost to Budenholzer's Bucks in six games after Trae Young was injured by stepping on an official's foot in Game 3. Two days after the Hawks were eliminated from their deep playoff run, the Hawks announced that McMillan had agreed in principle to a four-year deal as full-time head coach, a deal finalized on July 7. The 2020–21 Atlanta Hawks have been compared to the 1977–78 Seattle SuperSonics, in that both teams had poor records early on, made a coaching change, surged up the rankings to get better records, and made unexpected deep playoff runs.

On June 30, 2022, the Hawks traded Danilo Gallinari and three future first-round picks for San Antonio Spurs star point guard Dejounte Murray and Jock Landale. On July 6, the team traded Kevin Huerter to the Sacramento Kings for Maurice Harkless, Justin Holiday, and a future first-round pick. With the Young-Murray backcourt, the team finished the season below expectations with a 41–41 record and a first-round loss to the Boston Celtics.

In the 2023–24 season, shortly before the trade deadline with a losing record, the Hawks made it widely known they were willing to trade anyone on their team except Young and third-year forward Jalen Johnson. The Hawks finished the 2023–24 season with a 36–46 record, then fell to the Chicago Bulls 131–116 in the play-in tournament to miss the playoffs.

In the next off-season, Dejounte Murray was dealt to the New Orleans Pelicans for Dyson Daniels, Larry Nance Jr., E. J. Liddell, Cody Zeller and two future first-round picks, ending the Young–Murray backcourt after just two seasons. The Hawks won the 2024 draft lottery and used the first overall pick to select Zaccharie Risacher from France.

The Hawks played in the 2024 NBA Cup semifinal, with a record of 14–12 at the time, losing to the Bucks, preventing them from reaching their first NBA Cup Final. They finished the season two games under .500 after season-ending injuries to both Johnson (torn labrum) and backup point guard Kobe Bufkin (shoulder subluxation), and some roster turnover (DeAndre Hunter, amid an exceptional season as a backup forward, was traded at the deadline for veteran forwards Caris LeVert and Georges Niang from the Cleveland Cavaliers, while Bogdanovic was also traded at the deadline for guard Terance Mann from the Los Angeles Clippers. Zeller never suited up a game for the team, and was sent off as trade filler around the deadline to avoid his guaranteed salary).

Dyson Daniels was named the Kia 2024–25 Most Improved Player of the Year, after an outstanding defensive season in which he set a franchise record of 229 steals in a season, and easily leading the league in steals and deflections. Injuries hurt the Hawks, which in the play-in lost two straight games to Orlando and Miami to be eliminated from contention.

In the off-season, the Hawks had 13th, 22nd, and 32nd overall picks in the 2025 NBA draft. A few days before the draft, the Hawks, taking advantage of Boston's financial woes (as wrought by the new collective bargaining agreement that imposed punitive taxes on competing teams that exceed the salary cap), traded Niang and the 32nd pick for Kristaps Porziņģis as part of a three-team trade involving the Brooklyn Nets. On the day of the draft, the Pelicans, desperate to obtain the rights to rookie Derik Queen, traded the Hawks the 23rd pick, as well as an unprotected 2026 first-rounder (which conveyed to the 8th pick) in exchange for the 13th pick. With the 23rd pick, the Hawks selected forward Asa Newell, who played one year at the nearby University of Georgia and was widely considered to be a lottery pick before slipping to 23.

On July 1, 2025, Atlanta signed forward Nickeil Alexander-Walker from the Minnesota Timberwolves to a four-year, $62 million contract, and guard Luke Kennard from the Memphis Grizzlies to a one-year, $11 million contract. Atlanta lost centers Clint Capela and Larry Nance Jr., and forward Caris LeVert in free agency. On August 11, the Hawks signed forward Nikola Đurišić to a fully guaranteed contract, honoring an agreement made with the front office to take a G League contract the previous season.

=== 2026–current: Post Trae Young era ===
On January 9, 2026, the Hawks traded Trae Young to the Washington Wizards for CJ McCollum and Corey Kispert, bringing an end to Young's eight-seasons in Atlanta.

According to team sources, Young, who was coming off of an injury suffered in the fifth game of the season, requested the trade. It was widely speculated and eventually indirectly confirmed by Young that the stretch of play by the now-"leaderless" Hawks—one in which saw a more egalitarian offense and stubborn defense unheard of in Young's tenure—left him feeling as if it was a good time to pursue other options (as his contract was nearing renewal and the Hawks weren't willing to pay the max contract he desired). Likely inspired by the story of hometown hero Kevin Durant's acrimonious departure from Oklahoma City, he said he felt compelled to resolve the contract situation before the end-of-season, avoiding any difficult roster decisions for the front office, helmed by new general manager Onsi Saleh.

Kristaps Porziņģis, oft-injured in his own right (only playing 17 games due to his condition), was traded a few weeks later to Golden State in exchange for the rumor-mill regular Jonathan Kuminga and veteran guard Buddy Hield. In his Hawks debut, Kuminga was a revelation, returning to the hypothetical heights his supporters in Golden State fell in love with, but failed to make a consistently large impact. It was enough, however, to help propel the new-look Hawks to a torrid 11-game winning streak, lasting from February 23 to March 19 (including the infamous "Magic City Monday" theme night that was formally cancelled by the league for "issues with its messaging and brand"). The Hawks would go on to rise as high as the fifth seed, before a decision to rest the starters in loss against the Heat in the last game of the season caused them to fall to sixth yet avoid the play-in for the first time since 2021. Alexander-Walker was voted the NBA's Most Improved Player, making the first time in league history a team has had two players win the award in consecutive seasons. Jalen Johnson was also named to the All-NBA 3rd Team as well as getting an all star nod.

The Hawks would find themselves facing the Knicks in the first round, starting the series with a loss and pair of razor-thin wins over the eventual 2026 champions, in no small part due to veteran play by McCollum and Kuminga's defensive intensity. However, their depleted center rotation, as well as a lack of offensive firepower from Alexander-Walker and Johnson, caused the Hawks to fall in six after three consecutive blowout losses. They would then prove to be the only team to beat New York more than once, a run in which the Knicks posted a record-shattering point differential and 16–3 playoff record.

On June 22, 2026, the Hawks announced a trade with the Thunder's backup guard Aaron Wiggins for two future second round-picks (one in 2030, the other in 2032).

The Hawks entered the 2026 offseason with three draft picks. In the first round, the Hawks selected Houston freshman point guard Kingston Flemings at 8 and St.John's senior center/forward Zuby Ejiofor at 23. The following night, they would go on to draft 7-foot North Carolina center Henri Veesaar at 52, through a trade with the Clippers involving the 57th pick and cash considerations.

== Season-by-season record ==
List of the last five seasons completed by the Hawks. For the full season-by-season history, see List of Atlanta Hawks seasons.

Note: GP = Games played, W = Wins, L = Losses, W–L% = Winning percentage

Season	GP	W	L	W–L%	Finish	Playoffs
2021–22	82	43	39	.524	2nd, Southeast	Lost in first round, 1–4 (Heat)
2022–23	82	41	41	.500	2nd, Southeast	Lost in first round, 2–4 (Celtics)
2023–24	82	36	46	.439	3rd, Southeast	Did not qualify
2024–25	82	40	42	.488	2nd, Southeast	Did not qualify
2025–26	82	46	36	.561	1st, Southeast	Lost in first round, 2–4 (Knicks)

== Logos and uniforms ==
Throughout the club's history, the team has undergone several uniform changes. The Hawks logo has shifted between variations of a full-bodied hawk holding a basketball on its claws and a silhouette of a hawk head (more commonly known as the Pac-Man logo). Red and white have been a part of the team's palette for the most part since the 1950s, but the Hawks also used various accent colors as well. Red, blue and white served as the team's color scheme during the St. Louis and early Atlanta years (1955–70), and they wore red and white uniforms for much of their tenure in St. Louis. The team moved to Atlanta in 1968 and sported baby blue and white uniforms until 1970, when they went with a blue, green and white palette. Starting in 1972, the Hawks wore red and white uniforms with yellow accents, and added black as an accent color in 1992. The color switch coincided with the arrival of the NHL's Atlanta Flames, who wore the same colors and shared the same owner as the Hawks; the now-Calgary Flames even added black a few years after the Hawks made the same tweak. From 2007 to 2015, the Hawks returned to a red, blue and white scheme, adding silver as an accent color.

On May 1, 2014, the club adopted a stylized version of the 'Pac-Man' logo that it used from 1972 to 1995. The 'Pac-Man' logo (placed in a roundel) would become the team's primary logo after the conclusion of the team's 2014–15 season. On June 24, 2015, the team unveiled its new home, road and alternate uniforms, along with its updated logos and colors. The new color scheme consisted of Torch Red, Volt Green and Georgia Granite Gray. The team also unveiled its new socks and shoes, in conjunction with the NBA's new contract for official game socks with Stance. Previously, official game socks were primarily either white or black, depending on a team's preference. The team wore white for home games, Georgia Granite Gray for road games, and Torch Red as an alternate uniform color.

As part of the NBA's switch to Nike, the home and road designations were replaced by "Icon", "Association", and "Statement". The Hawks carried over their uniforms that they had worn the previous two seasons. The numbers on the white "Icon" uniform were changed to red with volt green trim; the other two uniforms remained the same.

On July 21, 2020, the Hawks unveiled new uniforms with a look similar to the set they wore in the mid-1970s. They also returned to the red, black and yellow color scheme they wore from 1992 to 2007, while adding gray as an accent color.

=== City uniform ===
The Hawks also wore special edition "City" uniforms as part of its uniform deal with Nike. In the 2017–18 season, the Hawks wore black uniforms with volt green accents, featuring asymmetrical striping inspired from the team's early 1970s uniforms and futuristic fonts as a nod to the city's hip-hop music scene. In the 2018–19 season, the Hawks wore white uniforms with black and metallic gold trim as a nod to the team's 50th anniversary in Atlanta. During the 2019–20 season, the Hawks wore black uniforms with peach accents as a tribute to Atlanta's Peachtree Street. This uniform returned in the 2025–26 season as part of the NBA revisiting past "City" uniform designs throughout the season. For 2020–21, the Hawks' "City" uniform paid tribute to civil rights icon Martin Luther King Jr., featuring a black base and gold accents. The 2021–22 "City" uniform featured various elements from previous uniforms, including a yellow base from the 2004–07 alternates, the full-bodied hawk logo from the 1995–99 uniform, the "Hawks" script of the 1980s uniforms, the retro "Atlanta" script from the 1970–72 uniforms, and the block numbers and striping of the 1960s uniforms. The Hawks then revisited the Peachtree theme in their 2022–23 "City" uniform, once again wearing black uniforms but with white/peach gradients on the striping and numbers, and a script "Atlanta" in white.

The 2023–24 "City" uniform featured a black base, heritage blue and light brown trim, and lowercase "atl" in white letters. The design, according to the team, "grabs inspiration from the spirit, determination, and interconnectivity of the city of Atlanta". This theme was revisited for the 2024–25 "City" uniform, with a look heavily based on the 1982–1992 uniforms.

The Hawks have confirmed their intent to re-use the 2020-21 "MLK" City Edition uniforms for the 2026–27 season.

== Rivalries ==
=== Boston Celtics ===
The Celtics–Hawks rivalry is a rivalry in the Eastern Conference of the NBA that has lasted for over five decades, although the two teams have played each other since the 1949–50 season, when the then-Tri-Cities Blackhawks joined the NBA as part of the National Basketball League and the Basketball Association of America merger. However, the Blackhawks could not field a truly competitive team until they moved to St. Louis as the St. Louis Hawks after a four-year stopover at Milwaukee. The two teams have faced each other eleven times in the NBA playoffs, four times in the NBA Finals, with the Celtics winning ten of twelve series against the Hawks, including three out of four NBA Finals. The rivalry intensified in 2016 with Hawks All-Star center Al Horford leaving the team and joining the Celtics, where he eventually won his first championship in the 2024 NBA Finals.

=== Orlando Magic ===
The Hawks and the Orlando Magic have an intense rivalry, mostly stemming from playoff competitions and the rising stardom of Dwight Howard and Josh Smith, both from the 2004 NBA draft and who were both raised in Georgia.

The two teams faced each other three times in the playoffs in 1996, 2010, and 2011. The Magic beat the Hawks in the second round of the 1996 playoffs in five games and swept their 2010 playoff matchup. The Hawks eliminated the Magic 4–2 in the first round of the 2011 playoffs.

In 2025 and 2026, several Hawks players were injured in play against the Magic, including Vít Krejčí and Larry Nance Jr. in the same game in 2025, and Jock Landale late in the 2026 season. Trae Young and coach Quin Snyder have both expressed frustration at the Magic's physical style of play against the Hawks: "The game plan [of the Magic] against the Hawks," Snyder said after Landale's injury, "is to try to punk us."

=== Charlotte Hornets ===
The rivalry between the Charlotte Hornets and Atlanta Hawks is driven by their proximity along the I-85 corridor (roughly 250 miles apart) and frequent Southeast Division matchups. While rarely reaching the intensity of NFL matchups between the Panthers and Falcons, they have maintained a competitive, often streaky history from the late 1980s through the 2020s.

== Home arenas ==
- Buffalo Memorial Auditorium (1946)
- Wharton Field House (1946–1951)
- Milwaukee Arena (1951–1955)
- Kiel Auditorium & St. Louis Arena (1955–1968)
- Alexander Memorial Coliseum (1968–1972, 1997–1999)
- Omni Coliseum (1972–1997)
  - Lakefront Arena (1984–1985; 12 games in New Orleans with Hawks serving as home team)
- Georgia Dome (1997–1999)
- State Farm Arena (1999–present; known as Philips Arena until State Farm purchased the naming rights in 2018)

== Personnel ==
=== Current roster ===
Atlanta Hawks roster
Players

Pos.	No.	Player	Height	Weight	DOB	From
G	7	Nickeil Alexander-Walker	6 ft 5 in (1.96 m)	205 lb (93 kg)	1998-09-02	Virginia Tech
G	5	Dyson Daniels	6 ft 7 in (2.01 m)	199 lb (90 kg)	2003-03-17	Australia
G	10	RayJ Dennis (TW)	6 ft 1 in (1.85 m)	180 lb (82 kg)	2001-03-30	Baylor
G	0	Luguentz Dort	6 ft 4 in (1.93 m)	220 lb (100 kg)	1999-04-19	Arizona State
F	20	Zuby Ejiofor	6 ft 8 in (2.03 m)	240 lb (109 kg)	2004-04-20	St. John's
F	8	Dorian Finney-Smith	6 ft 7 in (2.01 m)	220 lb (100 kg)	1993-05-04	Florida
G	4	Kingston Flemings	6 ft 3 in (1.91 m)	190 lb (86 kg)	2007-01-03	Houston
G	00	Keshon Gilbert (TW)	6 ft 3 in (1.91 m)	200 lb (91 kg)	2003-06-30	Iowa State
F	18	Mouhamed Gueye (injured)	6 ft 11 in (2.11 m)	210 lb (95 kg)	2002-11-09	Washington State
F	1	Jalen Johnson	6 ft 8 in (2.03 m)	219 lb (99 kg)	2001-12-18	Duke
F	24	Corey Kispert	6 ft 6 in (1.98 m)	224 lb (102 kg)	1999-03-03	Gonzaga
C	31	Jock Landale	6 ft 11 in (2.11 m)	255 lb (116 kg)	1995-10-25	Saint Mary's
G	3	CJ McCollum	6 ft 2 in (1.88 m)	190 lb (86 kg)	1991-09-19	Lehigh
F	14	Asa Newell	6 ft 9 in (2.06 m)	220 lb (100 kg)	2005-10-05	Georgia
F/C	17	Onyeka Okongwu	6 ft 10 in (2.08 m)	240 lb (109 kg)	2000-12-11	USC
C	13	Henri Veesaar (injured)	6 ft 11 in (2.11 m)	225 lb (102 kg)	2004-03-28	North Carolina
F	2	Aaron Wiggins	6 ft 5 in (1.96 m)	190 lb (86 kg)	1999-01-02	Maryland
F	22	Jalen Wilson (TW)	6 ft 6 in (1.98 m)	220 lb (100 kg)	2000-11-04	Kansas

Coaches
**Head coach**
- Quin Snyder
**Assistant(s)**
- Bryan Bailey
- Mike Brey
- Steve Klei
- Antonio Lang
- Sanjay Lumpkin
- Reggis Onwukamuche
- Ryan Schmidt
- Ashton Smith
- Ekpe Udoh
- Jett Watkinson

**Legend**
- **(DP)** Unsigned draft pick
- **(FA)** Free agent
- **(S)** Suspended
- **(GL)** On assignment to G League affiliate
- **(TW)** Two-way affiliate player
- Injured

Roster
Updated: October 17, 2026

=== Retained draft rights ===
The Hawks hold the draft rights to the following unsigned draft picks who have been playing outside the NBA. A drafted player, either an international draftee or a college draftee who is not signed by the team that drafted him, is allowed to sign with any non-NBA teams. In this case, the team retains the player's draft rights in the NBA until one year after the player's contract with the non-NBA team ends. This list also includes draft rights that were acquired from trades with other teams.

Draft	Round	Pick	Player	Pos.	Nationality	Current team	Note(s)	Ref
2017	2	60	Alpha Kaba	F/C	Guinea	Shenzhen Leopards (China)	Acquired from the Houston Rockets	

=== Retired numbers ===
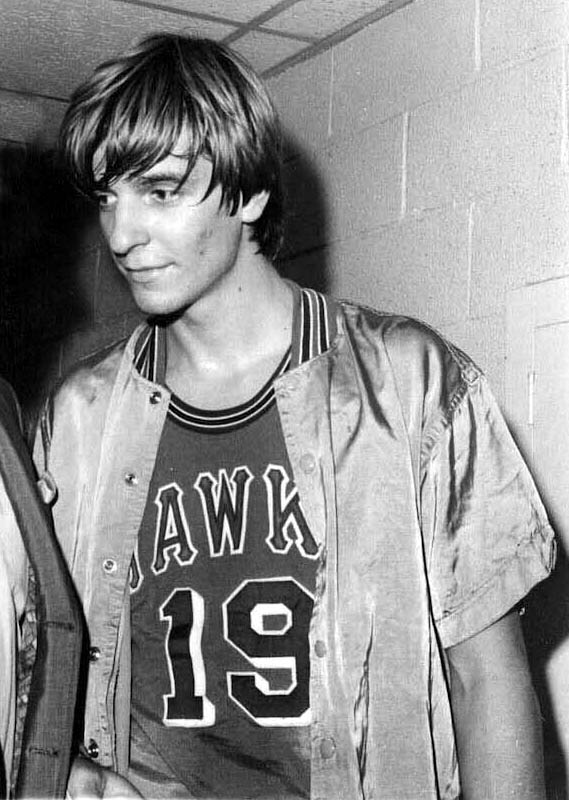
"Pistol" Pete Maravich played for Atlanta from 1970 to 1974. His uniform No. 44 was retired by the team

**Atlanta Hawks retired numbers**
No.	Player	Position	Tenure	Retired
**9**	Bob Pettit	F	1954–1965	
**21**	Dominique Wilkins	F	1982–1994	January 13, 2001
**23**	Lou Hudson	F/G	1966–1977	March 1, 1977
**44**	Pete Maravich	G	1970–1974	March 3, 2017
**55**	Dikembe Mutombo	C	1996–2001	November 24, 2015
**59** ^{1}	Kasim Reed	Mayor of Atlanta	2010–2018	November 3, 2017
**Ted Turner**	Ted Turner	Owner	1977–2001	November 30, 2004

Notes:

- ^{1} The Hawks retired number 59 jersey in honor of Reed who was the mayor of Atlanta from 2010 to 2018.
- The NBA retired Bill Russell's No. 6 for all its member teams on August 11, 2022.

=== Non-issued numbers ===
- **40** – Jason Collier, C, 2004–2005. Never officially retired, but taken out of circulation.

=== Basketball Hall of Famers ===
Atlanta Hawks Hall of Famers
Players
No.	Name	Position	Tenure	Inducted	No.	Name	Position	Tenure	Inducted
**20**; **50**	Ed Macauley ^{1}	C/F	1956–1959	1960	**9**	Bob Pettit	F/C	1954–1965	1971
**6**; **16**; **17**	Cliff Hagan	F/G	1956–1966	1978	**22**	Slater Martin ^{2}	G	1956–1960	1982
**14**	Bob Houbregs	C/F	1953	1987	**44**	Pete Maravich	G	1970–1974	1987
	Bobby McDermott	G	1947–1948	1988	**34**	Clyde Lovellette	C/F	1958–1962	1988
**14**; **15**; **32**	Lenny Wilkens ^{3}	G	1960–1968	1989	**42**	Connie Hawkins	F/C	1975–1976	1992
**8**	Walt Bellamy ^{4}	C	1970–1974	1993	**2**	Moses Malone	C/F	1988–1991	2001
**21**	Dominique Wilkins	F	1982–1994	2006	**15**; **18**; **19**	Richie Guerin ^{5}	G	1963–1967; 1968–1970	2013
**55**	Dikembe Mutombo	C	1996–2001	2015	**14**; **31**	Zelmo Beaty	C	1962–1969	2016
**1**	Tracy McGrady	G/F	2011–2012	2017	**10**	Maurice Cheeks	G	1991–1992	2018
**15**; **11**	Chuck Cooper	F	1954–1956	2019	**15**	Sidney Moncrief	G	1990–1991	2019
**7**	Toni Kukoč	F	2001–2002	2021	**23**	Lou Hudson	G/F	1966–1977	2022
**15**	Vince Carter	F	2018–2020	2024	**8**	Dwight Howard ^{8}	C	2016–2017	2025
Coaches
Name		Position	Tenure	Inducted	Name		Position	Tenure	Inducted
Red Auerbach		Head coach	1949–1950	1969	**10**	Red Holzman ^{6}	Head coach	1953–1957	1986
**4**; **6**; **33**	Alex Hannum ^{7}	Head coach	1957–1958	1998	Lenny Wilkens ^{3}		Head coach	1993–2000	1998
Contributors
Name		Position	Tenure	Inducted	Name		Position	Tenure	Inducted
Hubie Brown		Head coach	1976–1981	2005	**22**; **44**	Rod Thorn	G	1965–1967	2018
Cotton Fitzsimmons		Head coach	1972–1976	2021					

Notes:

- ^{1} He also coached the team in 1958–1960.
- ^{2} He also coached the team in 1957.
- ^{3} In total, Wilkens was inducted into the Hall of Fame three times – as player, as coach and as a member of the 1992 Olympic team.
- ^{4} In total, Bellamy was inducted into the Hall of Fame twice – as player and as a member of the 1960 Olympic team.
- ^{5} He also coached the team in 1964–1972.
- ^{6} He also played for the team in 1953–1954.
- ^{7} He also played for the team in 1954–1956 and 1956–1957.
- ^{8} In total, Howard was inducted into the Hall of Fame twice – as player and as a member of the 2008 Olympic team.

=== FIBA Hall of Famers ===
Atlanta Hawks Hall of Famers
Players
No.	Name	Position	Tenure	Inducted
**7**	Toni Kukoč	F	2001–2002	2017
**8**	Alexander Volkov	F/C	1989–1992	2020

=== Franchise leaders ===
Bold denotes still active with team.

Italic denotes still active but not with team.

Points scored (regular season) (as of the end of the 2025–26 season)

1. Dominique Wilkins (23,292)
2. Bob Pettit (20,880)
3. Lou Hudson (16,049)
4. Cliff Hagan (13,447)
5. John Drew (12,621)
6. Trae Young (12,413)
7. Joe Johnson (10,606)
8. Kevin Willis (10,582)
9. Josh Smith (10,371)
10. Eddie Johnson (9,631)
11. Zelmo Beaty (8,727)
12. Bill Bridges (8,685)
13. Lenny Wilkens (8,591)
14. Al Horford (8,288)
15. Mookie Blaylock (7,743)
16. Dan Roundfield (7,644)
17. Doc Rivers (7,357)
18. Pete Maravich (7,325)
19. Jason Terry (6,534)
20. Jeff Teague (6,484)
21. Steve Smith (6,291)
22. Joe Caldwell (6,072)
23. John Collins (5,768)
24. Tree Rollins (5,666)
25. Marvin Williams (5,616)
26. Stacey Augmon (5,356)
27. Walt Bellamy (5,289)
28. Paul Millsap (5,177)
29. Clyde Lovellette (4,733)
30. Alan Henderson (4,575)
31. Dennis Schröder (4,545)
32. Steve Hawes (4,498)
33. De'Andre Hunter (4,453)
34. Shareef Abdur-Rahim (4,309)
35. Richie Guerin (4,284)
36. Cliff Levingston (4,205)
37. Chuck Share (4,119)
38. Dikembe Mutombo (4,095)
39. **Onyeka Okongwu** (4,083)
40. Moses Malone (4,034)
41. Zaza Pachulia (4,032)
42. Bogdan Bogdanović (3,999)
43. John Battle (3,882)
44. Clint Capela (3,879)
45. Spud Webb (3,702)
46. Kent Bazemore (3,678)
47. **Jalen Johnson** (3,644)
48. Kyle Korver (3,615)
49. Tom McMillen (3,523)
50. Randy Wittman (3,522)

Other statistics (regular season) (as of the end of the 2025–26 season)

Most minutes played
Player	Minutes
Dominique Wilkins	32,545
Bob Pettit	30,690
Lou Hudson	25,825
Bill Bridges	23,574
Josh Smith	23,078
Kevin Willis	22,588
Cliff Hagan	21,731
Tree Rollins	20,763
Joe Johnson	19,733
Lenny Wilkens	19,552

Most rebounds
Player	Rebounds
Bob Pettit	12,849
Bill Bridges	8,656
Kevin Willis	7,332
Dominique Wilkins	6,119
Tree Rollins	5,994
Zelmo Beaty	5,622
Josh Smith	5,407
Al Horford	5,144
Cliff Hagan	5,116
Dan Roundfield	4,658

Most assists
Player	Assists
Trae Young	4,837
Doc Rivers	3,866
Mookie Blaylock	3,764
Eddie Johnson	3,207
Lenny Wilkens	3,049
Jeff Teague	2,771
Joe Johnson	2,653
Bob Pettit	2,369
Dominique Wilkins	2,321
Cliff Hagan	2,242

Most steals
Player	Steals
Mookie Blaylock	1,321
Dominique Wilkins	1,245
Doc Rivers	1,166
John Drew	859
Josh Smith	857
Eddie Johnson	741
Jeff Teague	632
Jason Terry	588
Kevin Willis	581
Stacey Augmon	570

Most blocks
Player	Blocks
Tree Rollins	2,283
Josh Smith	1,440
Dikembe Mutombo	1,094
Jon Koncak	747
Dan Roundfield	716
Al Horford	697
Dominique Wilkins	588
Clint Capela	460
Theo Ratliff	436
Kevin Willis	425

Most three-pointers made
Player	3-pointers made
Trae Young	1,295
Mookie Blaylock	1,050
Joe Johnson	908
Kyle Korver	818
Bogdan Bogdanović	745
Jason Terry	648
Kevin Huerter	563
Steve Smith	549
De'Andre Hunter	527
Dominique Wilkins	500

== Awards and accomplishments ==
=== Individual awards ===
NBA MVP

- Bob Pettit – 1956, 1959 (St. Louis Hawks)

NBA Defensive Player of the Year

- Dikembe Mutombo – 1997, 1998

NBA Rookie of the Year

- Bob Pettit – 1955 (St. Louis Hawks)

NBA Most Improved Player of the Year

- Alan Henderson – 1998
- Dyson Daniels – 2025
- Nickeil Alexander-Walker – 2026

NBA Sixth Man of the Year

- Jamal Crawford – 2010

NBA Coach of the Year

- Harry Gallatin – 1963 (St. Louis Hawks)
- Richie Guerin – 1968 (St. Louis Hawks)
- Hubie Brown – 1978
- Mike Fratello – 1986
- Lenny Wilkens – 1994
- Mike Budenholzer – 2015

NBA Executive of the Year

- Stan Kasten – 1986, 1987

NBA Sportsmanship Award

- Kyle Korver – 2015
- Vince Carter – 2020

J. Walter Kennedy Citizenship Award

- Doc Rivers – 1990
- Joe O'Toole – 1995
- Steve Smith – 1998

All-NBA First Team

- Bob Pettit – 1955–1964 (Milwaukee/St. Louis Hawks)
- Dominique Wilkins – 1986

All-NBA Second Team

- Frank Brian – 1951 (Tri-Cities Blackhawks)
- Slater Martin – 1957, 1958, 1959 (St. Louis Hawks)
- Cliff Hagan – 1958, 1959 (St. Louis Hawks)
- Bob Pettit – 1965 (St. Louis Hawks)
- Lou Hudson – 1970
- Pete Maravich – 1973
- Dan Roundfield – 1980
- Dominique Wilkins – 1987, 1988, 1991, 1993
- Dikembe Mutombo – 2001

All-NBA Third Team

- Dominique Wilkins – 1989
- Kevin Willis – 1992
- Dikembe Mutombo – 1998
- Joe Johnson – 2010
- Al Horford – 2011
- Trae Young – 2022
- Jalen Johnson – 2026

NBA All-Defensive First Team

- Dan Roundfield – 1980, 1982, 1983
- Wayne Rollins – 1984
- Mookie Blaylock – 1994, 1995
- Dikembe Mutombo – 1997, 1998
- Dyson Daniels – 2025

NBA All-Defensive Second Team

- Bill Bridges – 1969, 1970
- Joe Caldwell – 1970
- "Fast Eddie" Johnson – 1979, 1980
- Dan Roundfield – 1981, 1984
- Wayne Rollins – 1983
- Mookie Blaylock – 1996–1999
- Dikembe Mutombo – 1999
- Josh Smith – 2010
- Paul Millsap – 2016
- Dyson Daniels – 2026

NBA All-Rookie First Team

- Zelmo Beaty – 1963 (St. Louis Hawks)
- Lou Hudson – 1967 (St. Louis Hawks)
- Pete Maravich – 1971
- John Brown – 1974
- John Drew – 1975
- Dominique Wilkins – 1983
- Stacey Augmon – 1992
- Al Horford – 2008
- Trae Young – 2019
- Zaccharie Risacher – 2025

NBA All-Rookie Second Team

- Jason Terry – 2000
- Josh Childress – 2005
- Josh Smith – 2005
- Marvin Williams – 2006
- John Collins – 2018
- Kevin Huerter – 2019

=== NBA All-Star Weekend ===
NBA All-Star Game selections

- Frankie Brian – 1951
- Dike Eddleman – 1951, 1952
- Mel Hutchins – 1953
- Don Sunderlage – 1954
- Frank Selvy – 1955
- Bob Pettit – 1955–1965
- Bob Harrison – 1956
- Ed Macauley – 1957
- Slater Martin – 1957–1959
- Cliff Hagan – 1958–1962
- Clyde Lovellette – 1960, 1961
- Lenny Wilkens – 1963–1965, 1967, 1968
- Zelmo Beaty – 1966, 1968
- Bill Bridges – 1967, 1968, 1970
- Joe Caldwell – 1969, 1970
- Lou Hudson – 1969–1974
- Pete Maravich – 1973, 1974
- John Drew – 1976, 1980
- Eddie Johnson – 1980, 1981
- Dan Roundfield – 1980–1982
- Dominique Wilkins – 1986–1994
- Doc Rivers – 1988
- Moses Malone – 1989
- Kevin Willis – 1992
- Mookie Blaylock – 1994
- Christian Laettner – 1997
- Dikembe Mutombo – 1997, 1998, 2000, 2001
- Steve Smith – 1998
- Shareef Abdur-Rahim – 2002
- Joe Johnson – 2007–2012
- Al Horford – 2010, 2011, 2015, 2016
- Paul Millsap – 2014–2017
- Kyle Korver – 2015
- Jeff Teague – 2015
- Trae Young – 2020, 2022, 2024, 2025
- Jalen Johnson - 2026

NBA All-Star Game head coaches

- Alex Hannum – 1958
- Ed Macauley – 1959, 1960
- Paul Seymour – 1961
- Richie Guerin – 1969, 1970
- Mike Fratello – 1988
- Lenny Wilkens – 1994
- Mike Budenholzer – 2015

NBA All-Star Game MVP

- Bob Pettit – 1956, 1958, 1959, 1962

Preceded by Boston Celtics	NBA champions 1957–58	Succeeded by Boston Celtics
