= Udi Spielman =

Israeli singer and Hazzan (born 1951)

Udi Spielman אודי שפילמן
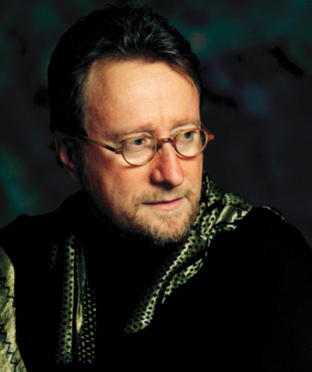
- Ehud (Udi) Spielman

Background information
- Born: Ehud Spielman; 1951 (age 74–75); Israel
- Genres: Contemporary Jewish Liturgical Music
- Occupation: Hazzan Singer
- Instrument: Singing
- Years active: 1951–present
- Website: www.udiandvarda.com

Ehud (Udi) Spielman (Hebrew: אהוד (אודי) שפילמן; born on December 4, 1951) is an Israeli singer and hazzan. He came to Chazzanut (cantorial music) after a long career as a singer and performer in Israel. He has published several CDs and DVDs. His music is featured in the Florida Atlantic University Judaica Sound Archives and will soon also be in the Dartmouth Jewish Sound Archives.

== Early life ==
Udi Spielman was born in 1951 in Tel-Aviv. He is the great-grandson of Zerach Barnett, a Zionist activist, settling first Petah Tikva and the initiator and founder of Neve Shalom Tel-Aviv. Both of Spielman's grandfathers were cantors.

Spielman studied at HaKfar HaYarok, an agricultural high school. After graduation, he entered the Israel Defense Forces (IDF) and served as a soloist and singer in the Israeli Air Force Band.

== Pop Music career ==
Following his honorable discharge from the IDF, Spielman recorded songs as a soloist.

In 1978, Spielman performed the song "Nesich haChlomot" (נסיך החלומות, Dream Prince), better known as "Valentino" along with Zvi Bums and Gali Atari, at the Festival Hazemer Ha'ivri (Israel Song Festival), the Israeli qualification heat for the Eurovision Song Contest. The song placed third. Spielman then created the band "Afifon" (Kite), which appeared in the 1980 Israel Song Festival performing the song "1980" (lyrics by Jacob Gilad, music by Yehudit Ravitz). In the same year, he appeared in the Chassidic Song Festival, and recorded two songs for their album of the same name. Later he founded the "Udi Spielman Band" which was Israel's most acclaimed and successful pop orchestra for twenty years performing both in Israel and abroad, and became the house band for Israel's first commercial TV channel for the Israel Broadcasting Services.

== Cantorial career ==
In 2000, Spielman retired his performing groups in order to study Chazzanut. He studied at and graduated from the Tel Aviv Cantorial Institute (TACI), administered by Cantor Naftali Hershtik, the Chief Cantor of the Great Synagogue in Jerusalem. Afterwards, Herstik referred Spielman to another teacher, who put him in touch with the greatest cantorial pianist, Raymond Goldstein. Chaim Feifel also added much to Udi's education as well. Besides his Cantorial services as a Hazzan, Udi has also performed in Cantorial concerts with the most highly regarded Hazzanim of our time. He also previously served as Artistic Director for the Concert Series of B’nai Torah Congregation, the largest Conservative Synagogue in the SE United States.

Since beginning his cantorial career, Spielman has launched one solo Cantorial CD (Seven – Voice and Spirit) and two liturgical music CDs (A still Small Voice and Set Me as a Seal) with his wife, Varda Noga Spielman, former singer with the Northern Command and the popular 80's girl's band Sexsta, as well as a concert DVD in 2012.

== Discography ==
- 2004 Seven Voice and Spirit
- 2008 A Still Small Voice
- 2008 Set me as a Seal
- 2012 Udi and Varda Spielman in Concert 2012

== See also ==
- List of Israeli musical artists
- List of Jewish musicians
