= Yaakov Lemmer =

American singer (born 1983)

Yaakov ("Yanky") Lemmer יעקב לעממער
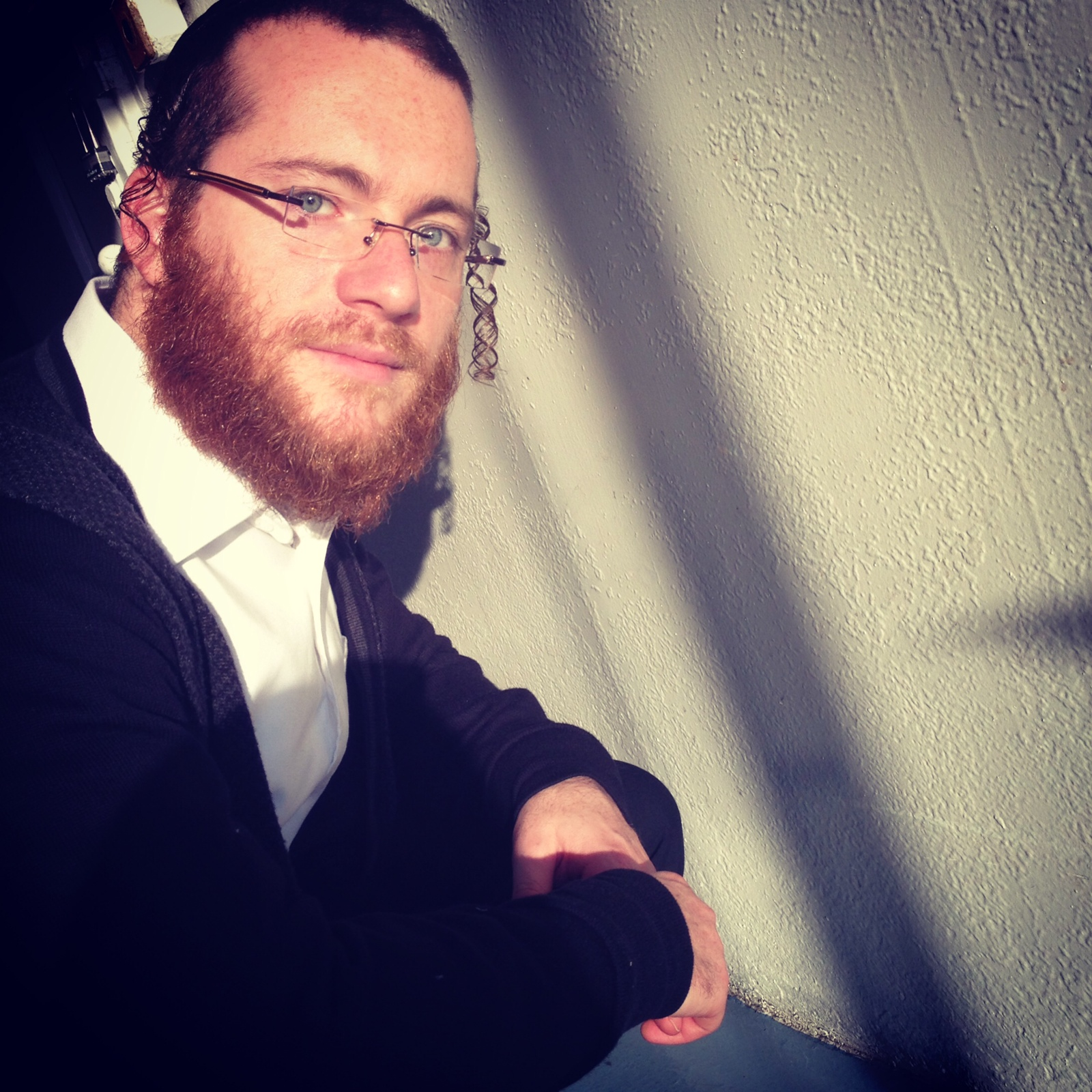

Background information
- Also known as: "Yanky" or "Yanky Lemmer"
- Born: Yaakov Lemmer; November 6, 1983 (age 42); Brooklyn, New York
- Genres: Hebrew Liturgy, Yiddish folk, Opera, Broadway, Israeli, Hasidic
- Occupations: Singer, Head Cantor, Special Education Therapist
- Instrument: Voice
- Years active: 2005-present
- Labels: Nigun Distributors, International Music Company
- Website: www.cantorlemmer.com

Yaakov ("Yanky") Lemmer (born November 6, 1983) is an American Chazzan (Jewish cantor) and performing artist. Lemmer performs traditional Hebrew liturgy, Yiddish folk, opera, Broadway, Israeli, and Hasidic music.

Lemmer currently serves as Head Cantor of Lincoln Square Synagogue, a Modern Orthodox congregation in New York City.

== Early life and education ==
Yaakov Lemmer was born on November 6, 1983, in the predominantly Jewish neighborhood Borough Park, New York. The grandchild of Polish Jews, Lemmer grew up listening to Jewish music and radio which inspired him to become a cantor.

Lemmer first received formal cantorial training in 2005 at Young Israel Beth El of Borough Park, under cantor Benzion Miller. He later went on to train privately with cantor Noach Schall. Upon high school graduation, Lemmer received a scholarship to the Belz School of Jewish Music at Yeshiva University where he studied with cantors Joseph Malovany and Bernard Beer. Lemmer graduated with a dual bachelor's degree in liberal arts from Aspen University and a master's degree in special education from Touro College in 2013.

== Career ==
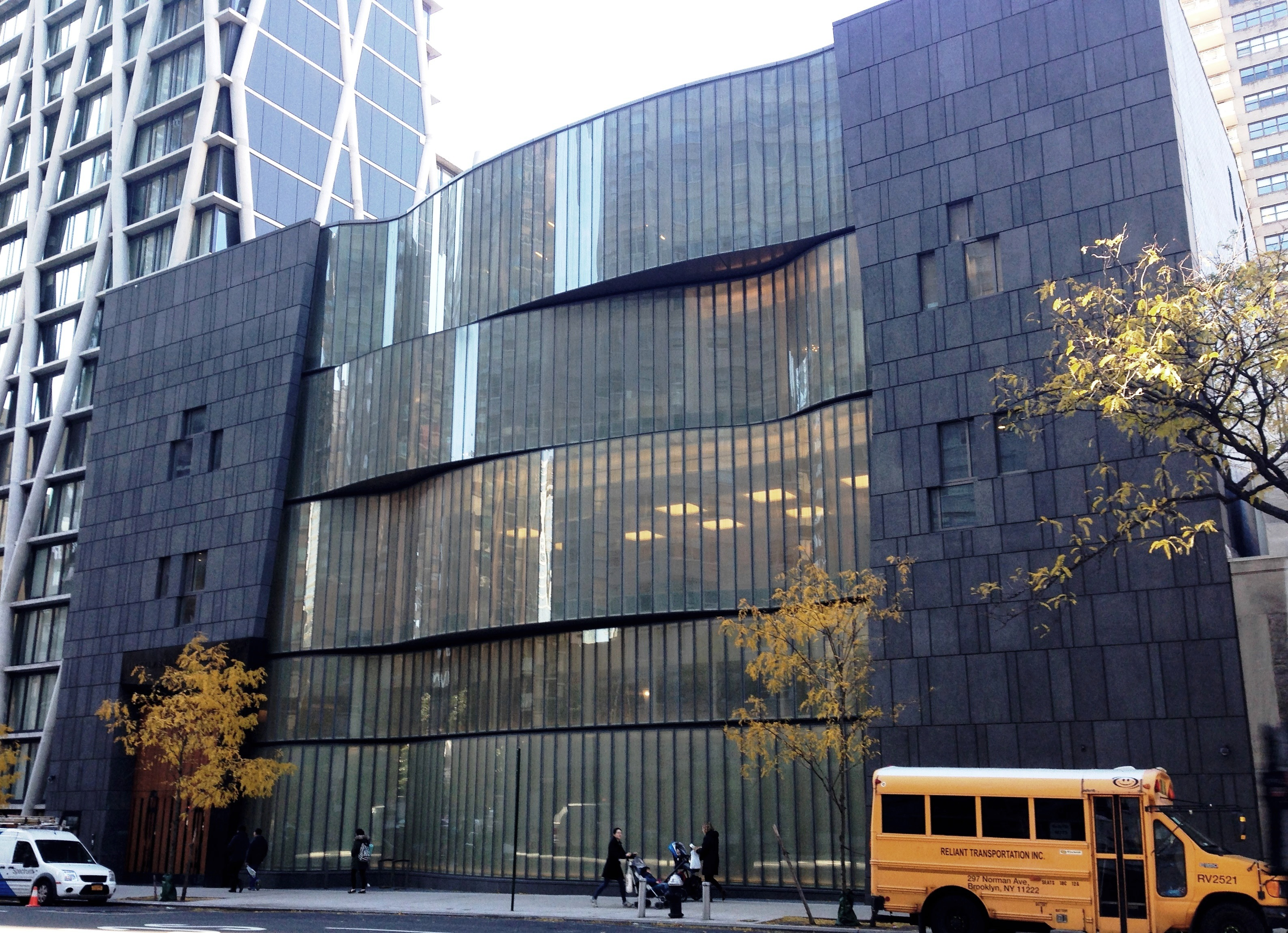
Lincoln Square Synagogue in 2016.

=== Cantorial positions ===
Lemmer has held the position of Chazzan at four synagogues since the start of his career. He currently holds the position of head Cantor at Lincoln Square Synagogue and formerly cantored at Young Israel in Fort Lee, New Jersey, Congregation Anshe Sholom of New Rochelle, New York, and Congregation Ahavath Torah of Englewood, New Jersey.

=== ”Misratze B’rachmim” ===
In February 2007, while participating as guest Cantor in a post-Tu Bishvat concert at Young Israel Beth El of Borough Park, Lemmer was recorded performing “Misratze B'rachmim.” This video was uploaded to YouTube. Soon after, Lemmer was invited to sing at the Jewish Culture Festival in Budapest, Hungary, where he sang with the Jerusalem Cantors' Choir as well as cantor Benzion Miller. Lemmer himself described YouTube as "the springboard" to his career.

=== International performances ===
Lemmer has performed in concerts and ceremonies in Poland, England, Israel, Germany, Denmark, France, Belgium, and throughout the United States.

=== Boston Jewish Music Festival ===
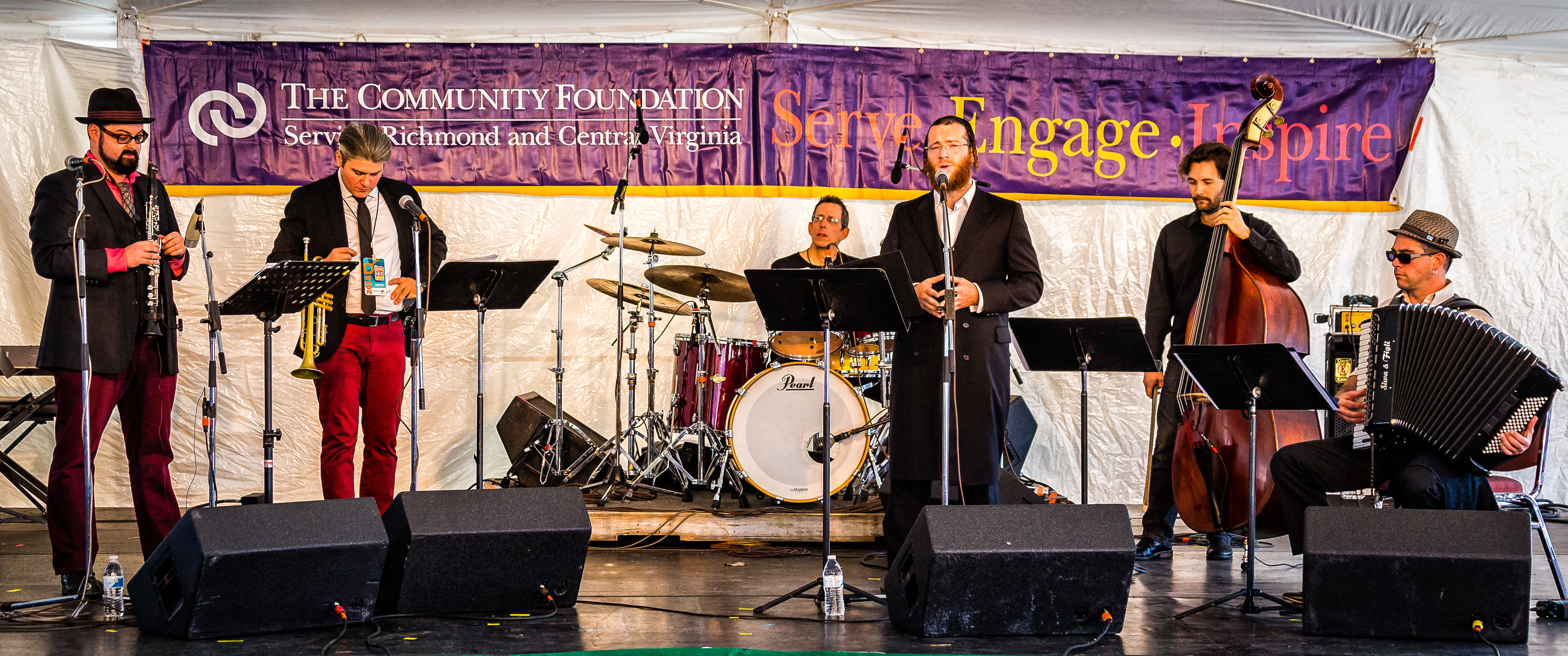
Yaakov Lemmer performing at the 2015 Richmond Folk Festival.

The Boston Jewish Music Festival holds concerts, lectures, and other educational events to promote Jewish culture. On March 12, 2011, the Boston Jewish Music Festival featured a concert, "Divine Sparks – Music to Ignite Your Soul: A Concert of Kavanah," in which Lemmer performed. Bill Marx, editor of The Arts Fuse, a Boston-based online art magazine, wrote:

"All of the judges found the concert ambitious and fascinating, a valuable step in expanding the creative and cultural boundaries of "Jewish music." The cantors were generally admired, with the recognition that they sang with great devotion, spiritual power, and a proud exuberance."

=== Lighting of the National Menorah ===
Every year in Washington D.C., the National Menorah is lit on the first night of Hanukkah. On December 20, 2011, Lemmer joined cantors Yaakov Motzen and Jeffrey Nadel to sing traditional Hanukkah songs with the United States Marine Band. Lemmer has since returned to Washington, D.C., in 2012, 2015, 2016, and 2017 to perform at the same event.

=== 70th anniversary of the Warsaw Ghetto Uprising ===
On April 19, 2013, the 70th anniversary of the Warsaw Ghetto Uprising, Lemmer performed with the Israeli Philharmonic Orchestra (conducted by Zubin Metah) at the site of the old Warsaw Ghetto as part of a large event.

== Personal life ==
Lemmer resides in Brooklyn, New York, with his wife and children, and works as a special education therapist. His brother is singer Shulem Lemmer, the first born-and-raised Haredi Jew to sign a major record contract with a leading label, Universal Music Group, under its classical music Decca Gold imprint. The two brothers are second cousins once removed of Harvard Law Prof. Alan Dershowitz.

== Significant works ==
=== "Rainbow in the Night" ===
In December 2011, Lemmer debuted the song and accompanying music video, "Rainbow in the Night". The song and video, written by filmmaker Cecelia Margules, a daughter of Holocaust survivors, depict a Jewish family in Poland before World War II. Margules collaborated with producer and director Danny Finkelman on the film to raise awareness about the Holocaust. The portrayed Polish family end up in the Krakow Ghetto, and finally in a concentration camp. Filmed on location in Krakow, Poland, and the Majdanek concentration camp, Margules described the film as the "first-ever music video depicting the Holocaust".

=== The New York Cantors PBS Special ===
On September 1, 2008, Lemmer performed sacred Jewish music with cantors Azi Schwartz and Netanel Herstik as part of a PBS special titled, "The New York Cantors: Music of Memory and Joy." The PBS special is often aired regionally and nationally.

== Discography ==
=== "Bkoil" ===
Released February 19, 2018, Bkoil is a compilation album by Mizmor Music. Lemmer performs one of the album’s seven singles, entitled "Halben Chato'einu."

=== "Vimaleh Mshaloseinu" ===
Released January 27, 2010, Vimaleh Mshaloseinu is Lemmer's debut studio album and features 11 songs:

1. Ato Nigleiso
2. Lo Tachmod
3. Shema Yisroel
4. Mein Zeiden's Chulem
5. Misratze B'rachamim
6. Av Harachamim
7. Ma Godlu Ma'asecho
8. Habeit Mishomayim
9. Umipnei Chatoeinu
10. Zol Shoyn Kumen Di Geulah
11. Lemmer 1928 version

=== "Unity for Justice" ===
"Unity for Justice" is a single released by Aderet Music Corporation featuring over 40 singers including Lemmer. The single was created as a charity project to collect donations for a Jewish business owner.

=== "Rainbow in the Night" single ===
The audio-only single from the "Rainbow in the Night" music video was released on January 25, 2012, produced by Sparks Production and distributed by Aderet Music Corporation.

=== "It Is Shabbos" ===
Released September 19, 2014, Lemmer's second studio album, "It Is Shabbos," features 11 songs including:

1. Mimkomcho by Rabbi Shlomo Carlebach
2. Rozo D'shabbos by Pierre Pinchik
3. Yismach Moshe
4. Gut Fun Avrohom / Zul Nokh Zayn Shabbos
5. Kehilos Hakodesh
6. Mamele
7. Ad Heino
8. Shabbos Koidesh by David Prager
9. Hamavdil
10. Yedid Nefesh by Samuel Malavsky
11. Zemiros Medley by Oscar Julius
