= Tel Aviv Cantorial Institute =

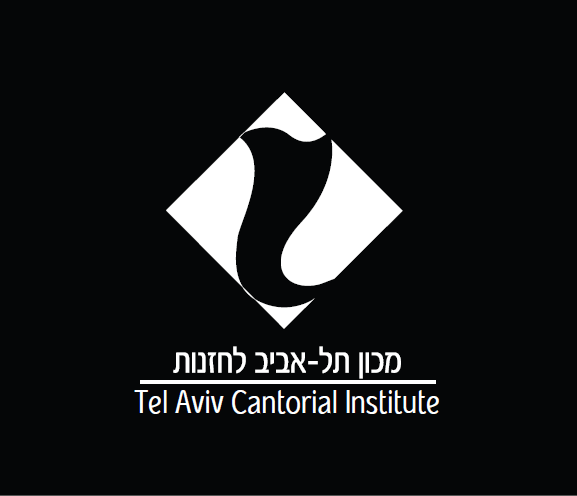
- Established: 1984; 41 years ago
- Address: 22 Zeitlin Street; Tel Aviv, Israel
- Website: taci.org.il

Tel Aviv Cantorial Institute (Hebrew: מכון תל־אביב לחזנות, romanized: Mekhon Tel-Aviv le-ḥazzanut) is an Israeli institution dedicated to training hazzanim and preserving the traditions of nusach tefillah.

== History ==
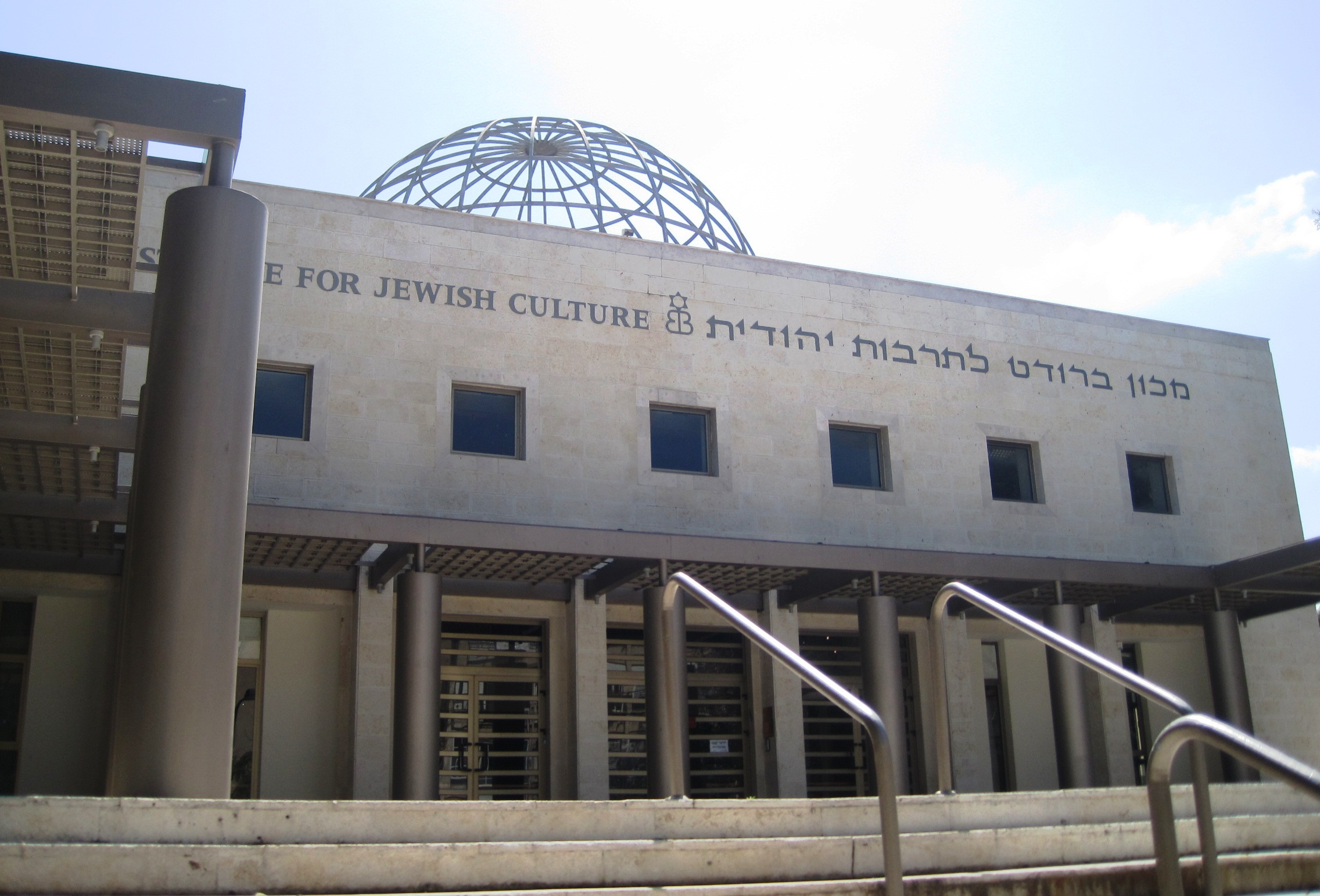
Brodt Center for Jewish Culture in 2012.

The initiative to establish a cantorial school began in 1984, when Maurice Jaffe, founder of the Jerusalem Great Synagogue, convened a meeting to address concerns about the decline of the cantorial tradition. Present were Naftali Herstik, Moshe Stern, Elli Jaffe, and Tzvi Talmon. At this meeting, it was decided to create an academy devoted to cantorial study, which opened that year at Heichal Shlomo in Jerusalem.

The Institute relocated to Tel Aviv in 1987 following an initiative by Mayor Shlomo Lahat and Chaim Wiener. In 1991, it came under the auspices of the municipality of Tel Aviv, and Herstik was appointed its artistic director and later general director.

The Institute moved in 2004 to its current location at the Brodt Center for Jewish Culture on Zeitlin Street in Tel Aviv. The Institute houses an auditorium, a recording studio, and a specialized library containing music in Hebrew, Yiddish, and Ladino, as well as Hasidic liturgical texts. The institute is also dedicated to discovering and publishing previously lost or new works of Jewish music and liturgy.

== Alumni ==
A number of prominent cantors have studied at the institute, including Yitzchak Meir Helfgot, David Weinbach, Moshe Haschel, Azi Schwartz, and Gideon Zelermyer.
