= Nancy Abramson =

American cantor

Nancy Abramson was the first female president of the Cantors Assembly, an international professional organization of cantors associated with Conservative Judaism; she took up that office in 2013. She served as cantor for fourteen years at Park Avenue Synagogue, for twelve years at West End Synagogue in Manhattan, and for five years at Congregation Sons of Israel in Briarcliff Manor, New York. She is a member of the Women Cantors Network. In 2011 she became Director of the H. L. Miller Cantorial School at the Jewish Theological Seminary. She retired in 2023.
