= Shulem Lemmer =

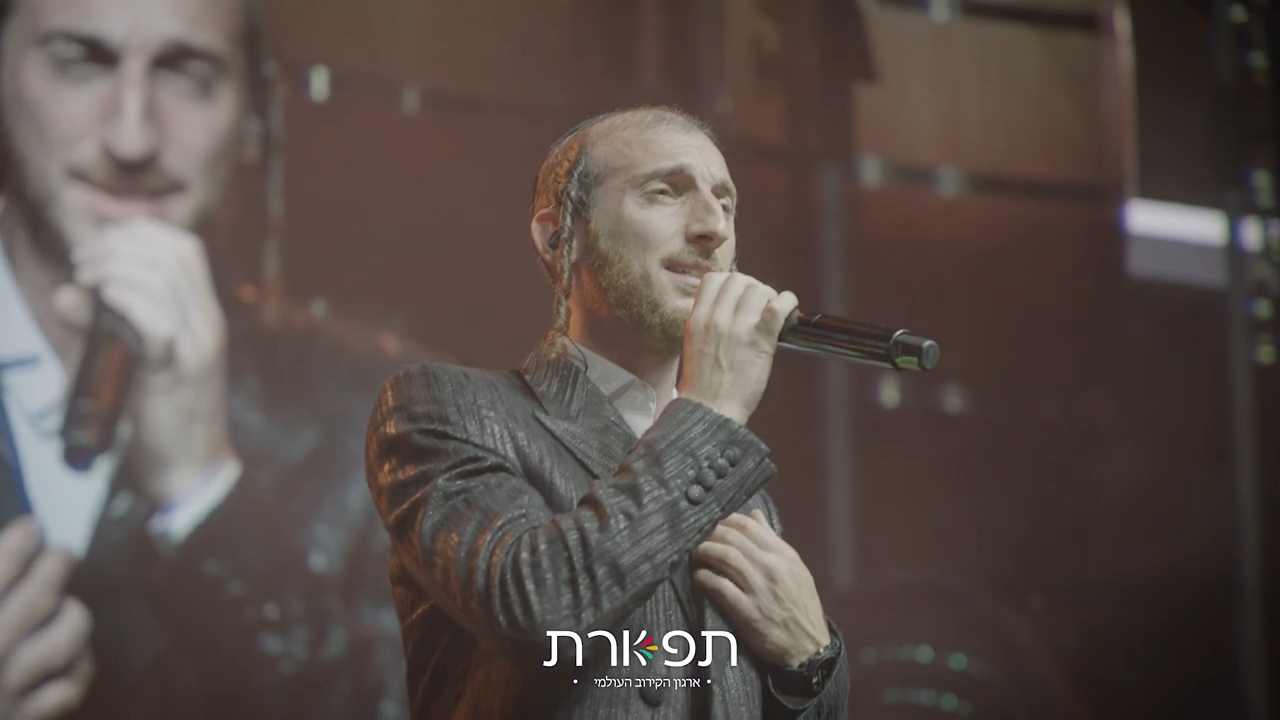
- Lemmer performing in 2023

Background information
- Born: November 6, 1989 (age 36); Borough Park, Brooklyn, New York City
- Occupation: Singer
- Label: Universal Music Group
- Website: iamshulem.com

Shulem Lemmer (born November 6, 1989), known professionally simply as "Shulem," is an American Belz Hasidic singer from Borough Park, Brooklyn, in New York City. He is the first born-and-raised Charedi Jew to sign a major record contract with a leading label, Universal Music Group, under its classical music Decca Gold imprint.

== Early life ==
Lemmer was born and raised in Borough Park, Brooklyn, in New York City. He is a fifth-generation American, from a Hasidic family of the Belz movement. Belz is a town in Galicia, in eastern Europe, where the Belz dynasty originated. Lemmer is the youngest of eight children.

Lemmer studied at the Belzer Cheder in Borough Park, and attended the Mir Yeshiva in Jerusalem, living in Israel for six and a half years. He began performing at small family events when he was 10 years old; when he was 13 his sister Tzippy, who later died at 23 years of age in a car accident a few weeks after she was married, encouraged him to perform on stage at a brother's wedding. His older brother, Yanky, is the cantor in Manhattan's Lincoln Square Synagogue. The Lemmers are second cousins of renowned Harvard Law Prof. Alan Dershowitz.

Before becoming a full-time singer, Lemmer was the director of marketing at a technology firm start-up based in Williamsburg, Brooklyn. He also still works as a cantor during the High Holidays at Congregation Ahavath Torah, a Modern Orthodox synagogue in Englewood, New Jersey.

== Musical career ==
Lemmer is a tenor. He has not had any formal training; he researched vocal training on YouTube and Google and learned how to perform "on the job". He released an album in 2017 entitled Shulem.

He is the first born-and-raised Hasidic Jew to sign with a major record label, having signed with Universal Music Group under its classical music Decca Gold imprint. Lemmer consults with a team of rabbinic advisors; his contract stipulates that he can refuse a performance for any reason.

In April 2019, Lemmer sang “God Bless America” at Citi Field. He has toured in American and Israeli cities, and sung in London, Krakow, Frankfurt, and Zurich.

The music on his November 2019 major label debut album, The Perfect Dream, is produced by Jon Cohen and accompanied by London's Royal Philharmonic Orchestra. It consists of English, Hebrew, and Yiddish songs, including the Israeli song “Jerusalem of Gold,” and “Bring Him Home” from the Broadway musical “Les Misérables.” The title track of the album, "The Perfect Dream," is an original song written for Lemmer by lyricist Don Black.

During the coronavirus pandemic, Lemmer was recruited by the Department of Health and Human Services to raise awareness about the virus to Orthodox Jewish communities.

On Holocaust Memorial Day, Shulem Lemmer sang at the United Nations.

In March 2023, Lemmer released his third studio album, Kiddush Hashem, which he produced himself, as well as serving as the co-composer for some of the songs.

In November 2023, Lemmer sang the cover of Bring Him Home and changed the main lyric to Bring Them Home in solidary to the October 7 Hostages at an event in the United Kingdom.

== Discography ==
- Shulem (2017)
- The Perfect Dream (2019)
- Kiddush Hashem (2023)

== Personal life ==
Lemmer lives in the North Dover section of Toms River, New Jersey, having moved there with his family in 2017. He is married, and has four children.

In 2019, he was awarded a Jew in the City All-Star Award.

His brother Yaakov Lemmer is a hazzan (cantor) and performing artist who currently serves as Head Cantor of Lincoln Square Synagogue, a Modern Orthodox congregation in New York City. Lemmer and his brother have performed and recorded music together (as "Shulem and Yanky Lemmer"), including a live performance of "Lo Sachmod" with Shira Choir in 2016 and the 2021 studio release The Man From Vilna.
