= Shalom Kadosh =

Israeli chef

- שלום קדוש
- Born: 1947 or 1948; French Morocco

Shalom Kadosh (Hebrew: שלום קדוש; born 1947 or 1948) is an Israeli chef. He has been considered the unofficial chef of Israel's prime ministers, including Menachem Begin, Yitzhak Rabin, Ariel Sharon, and Benjamin Netanyahu.

== Early life ==
Kadosh was born near Marrakesh, French Morocco into a family with nine siblings. They made aliyah to Israel when he was 14 and settled in Afula. He became interested in traveling as a young man, and began studying at a cooking school in Haifa so he could save up for travel funds.

== Career ==
Early in his career, he worked as a cook on a cruise ship. He opened the kosher restaurant "Cow on the Roof" at Leonardo Plaza Hotel Jerusalem in 1979, and worked there until it closed in 1993. He continued working as executive chef of Leonardo Plaza Hotel Jerusalem, and marked 35 years there in 2010. He continued to preside over Primavera, the hotel's Italian restaurant, as of 2013.

He prepared a recreation of an ancient Israelite Essene meal at Qumran for 400 guests of the Israel Museum in 1981. He organized the food for the "King David Feast" in 1996, which was held to celebration 3,000 years of Jerusalem. He cooked food for the inaugural "Golan Vintage: Wine & Culinary Festival" in 1998, held by the Golan Heights Winery, and returned to the festival again in 2001. He appeared on an episode of Duet the same year. He was the chef for the World Holocaust Forum in January 2020, which included 41 heads of state.

During his career, he has cooked for a number of heads of state, his first being American president Jimmy Carter. He has also cooked for French president Jacques Chirac, King Hussein of Jordan, Queen Beatrix of the Netherlands, Russian president Dmitry Medvedev, and American presidents Bill Clinton, George H. W. Bush, and Barack Obama (in 2013). French food critic Gilles Pudlowski dubbed Kadosh the "Kosher Bocuse". He joined the prestigious Club des Chefs des Chefs in 2011. He received a Lifetime Achievement Award from the Restaurants Association in 2022.

== Personal life ==
Kadosh and his wife, Zohara, have a daughter together.

During an attempted robbery by Ali Adkidak at a Jerusalem gas station in March 2021, he sustained fractures to his neck and skull. Adkidak was later convicted and sentenced to 39 months in prison.
