= Mordechai Ben Hurin =

Israeli architect (1930–2020)

Mordechai Ben-Hurin
- Education: Technion - Faculty of Architecture and Town planning
- Occupation: Architect
- Years active: 1954–2020
- Notable work: Beit Jabotinsky, Asia House, Dizengoff Tower - all three in Tel Aviv

Mordechai "Moti" Ben-Hurin (18 October 1930 – 23 October 2020) was an Israeli architect.

== Biography ==
Ben-Hurin was a fourth-generation native of Eretz Israel, a descendant of the Raab family, and the son of Leah and engineer Moshe Ben-Hurin (Ginzburg), with whom he partnered until his father's death in 1972. He graduated with honors from the Technion – Israel Institute of Technology in Haifa in 1956.

Ben-Hurin was responsible for designing some of the most prominent and original office buildings and public institutions in Israel, including the Asia House and Metzudat Ze'ev in Tel Aviv, the residential tower above Dizengoff Center, and the Leonardo Plaza Hotel Jerusalem (formerly Plaza Hotel). He also designed many private homes, particularly in Savyon, and a number of schools, dormitories, and dining halls for Youth Aliyah institutions across Israel.

During the 1980s, he served as the in-house architect of Ben Gurion Airport and was responsible for designing the arrivals hall, reception area, and VIP lounge in Terminal 1 (the "old" terminal, which was renovated and reopened in June 2017 for low-cost flights). He resigned from the planning of the new Terminal 3, stating it was "megalomaniac and entirely unnecessary at this stage." He proposed an alternative solution to the Israel Airports Authority involving the expansion of the existing terminal, but it was rejected.

Ben-Hurin continued working until his final days, including planning an office tower above the original Asia House he designed in 1970.

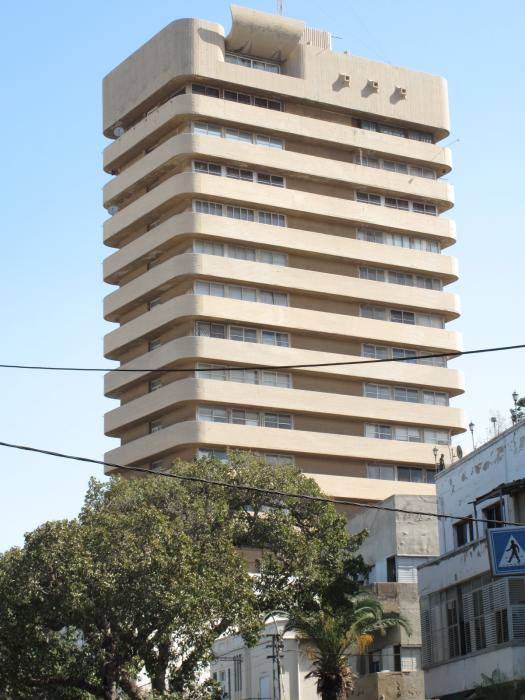
Metzudat Ze'ev / Beit Jabotinsky, Tel Aviv

In 2015, he deposited his professional archive in the Israel Architecture Archive.

He lived in Savyon and died on 23 October 2020 at the age of 90 due to a heart attack.

== Selected Projects ==
- Asia House, 4 Weizmann St., Tel Aviv-Yafo, 1970
- Beit Jabotinsky (Metzudat Ze’ev), 36 King George St., Tel Aviv-Yafo, 1964
- Central Tax Office Building (Histadrut), 115 Arlozorov St., Tel Aviv-Yafo, 1964
- Residential tower above Dizengoff Center, Tel Aviv-Yafo, 1980
- Leonardo Plaza Hotel Jerusalem, 38 King George St., Jerusalem, 1968
- Sapir Center, Jerusalem St., Kfar Saba, 1973
- Culture, Arts, Sports and Education Center, Mabatho, South Africa, 1984
- Buildings at Ben Gurion Airport:
  - Arrivals Hall, 1980
  - VIP and Immigration Hall, 1984
  - Reception Hall, 1985
- Centers for blind and disabled children, Petah Tikva and Kfar Saba, 2000
- “Beit HaDekalim,” Rothschild & Rav Kook St., Petah Tikva, 1960
- “Beit HaMa'alot,” 15 Maskin St., Petah Tikva, 2011
- Beit Hakerem Synagogue, Jerusalem, 1973
- Children's Synagogue, “Mossad Aliyah” Kfar Avraham, Petah Tikva, 1956
- Children's Synagogue, Ben Shemen Youth Village, 1969
- “Mitzpeh Yerushalayim” – cottage neighborhood in Ramot Alon, Jerusalem, 1980
- Shmuel Weng Family House (Plato Sharon), Savyon, 1969
- Rekanati House, Tzahala, 1996
- Barenboim House, Kfar Shmaryahu, 2008
- Shaul Eisenberg Family House, Savyon, 1966
- Electronics school and sports hall at ORT Yad Lebovitz School, Netanya, 1959–1969
- Residence of Moshe Sternshus and Ruth Tzarfati, Tel Aviv-Yafo

== Gallery ==
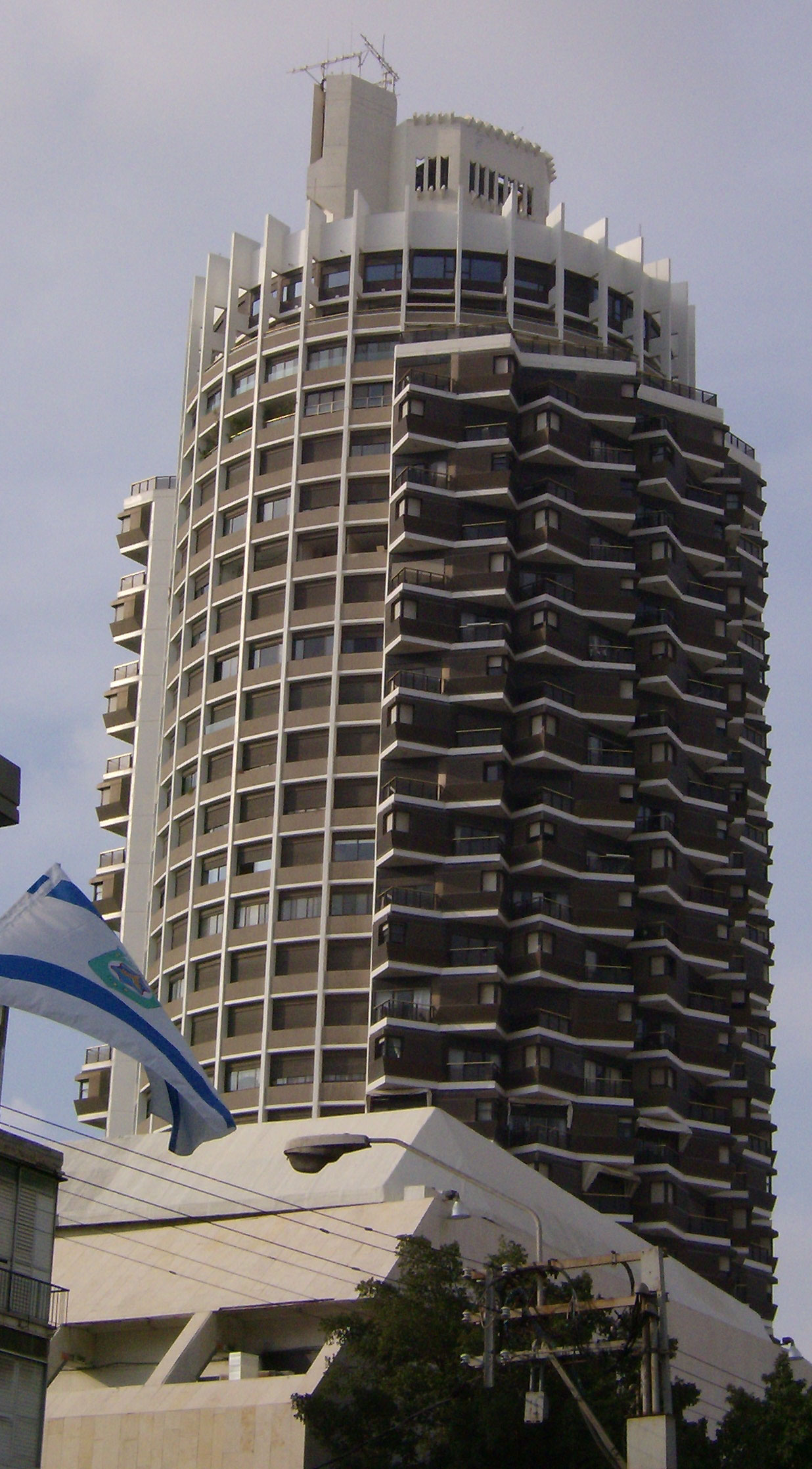
Dizengoff Tower, Tel Aviv

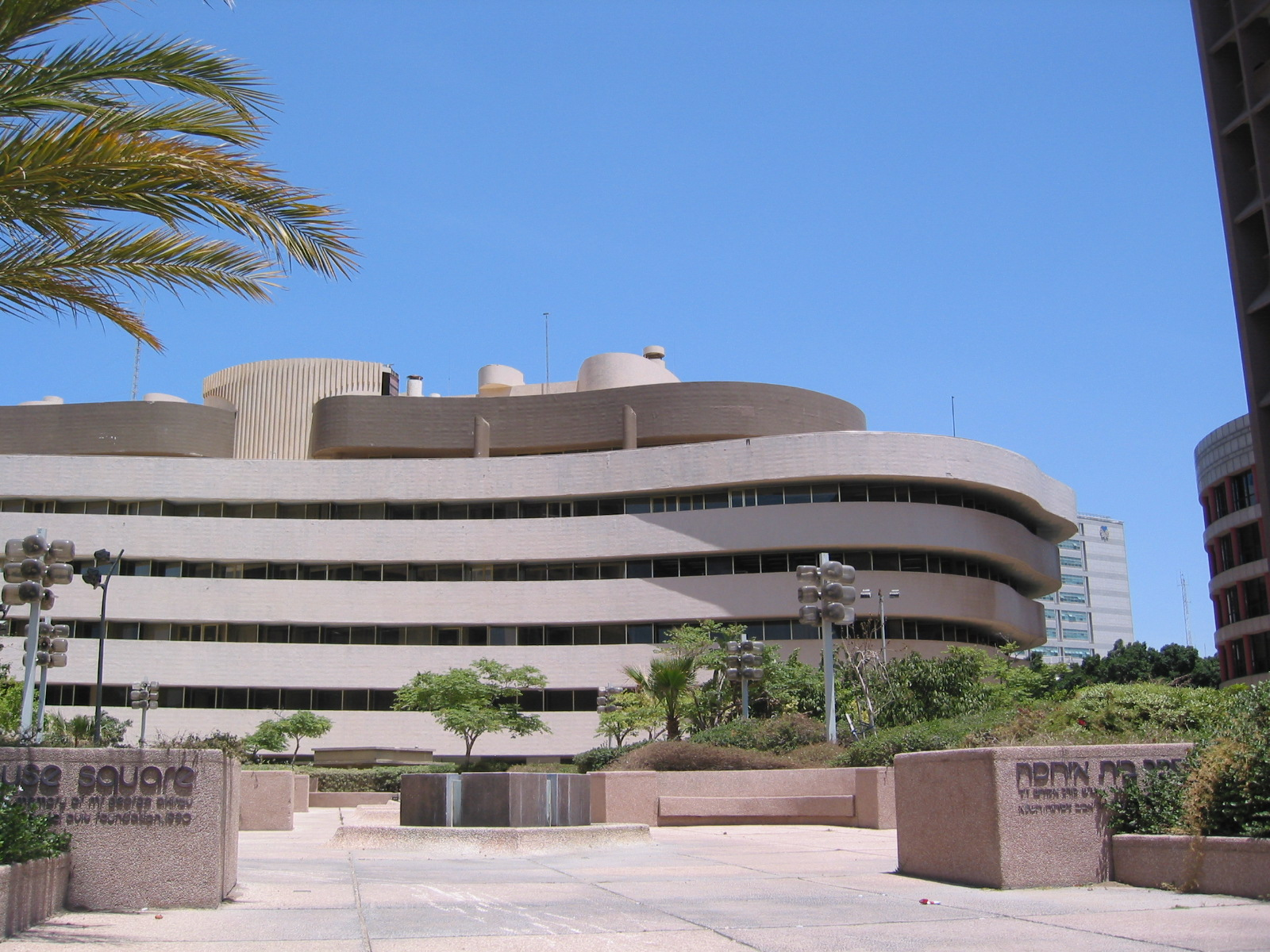
Asia House, Tel Aviv

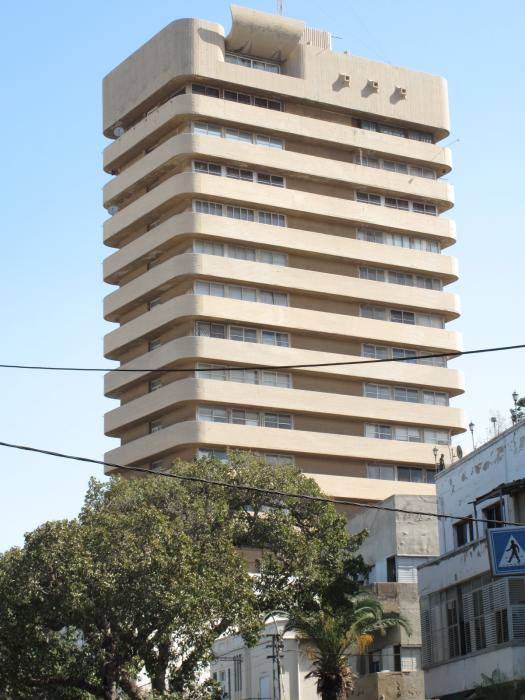
Beit Jabotinsky, 1966, Tel Aviv
