= Park Avenue Synagogue =

Conservative Jewish congregation in Manhattan, New York

- Hebrew: אגודת ישרים
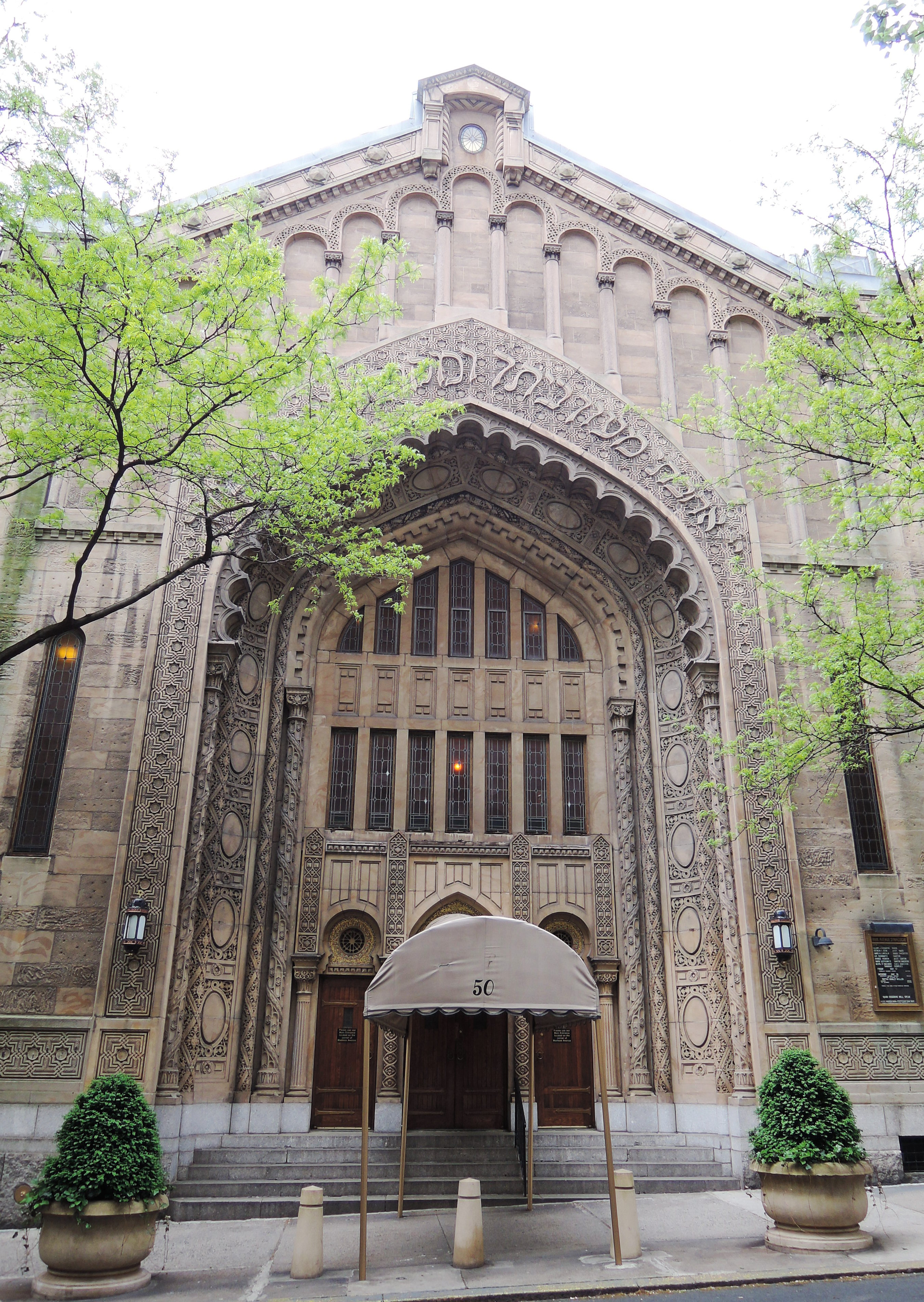
- Main façade of Park Avenue Synagogue, seen from East 87th Street

Religion
- Affiliation: Conservative Judaism
- Rite: Ashkenazic
- Ecclesiastical or organisational status: Synagogue
- Leadership: Rabbi Elliot Cosgrove; Rabbi Neil Zuckerman; Cantor Azi Schwartz
- Year consecrated: March 27, 1927
- Status: Active

Location
- Location: 50 East 87th Street
- Municipality: Manhattan
- State: New York
- Country: United States
- Interactive map of Park Avenue Synagogue
- Coordinates: 40°46′52″N 73°57′28″W

Architecture
- Type: Synagogue
- Style: Moorish
- Established: 1882 (as a congregation)
- Completed: 1927

Website
- www.pasyn.org

The Park Avenue Synagogue (Hebrew: אגודת ישרים, romanized: Agudat Yesharim, lit. 'The Association of the Righteous') is a Conservative Jewish congregation at 50 East 87th Street on the Upper East Side of Manhattan in New York City, New York. It was founded in 1882.

== History ==
The congregation was founded in 1882 as the Reform congregation, "Temple Gates of Hope", by a group of German Jews. After several mergers, the congregation took the Hebrew name "Agudat Yesharim", and later petitioned the state of New York to change the official name of the congregation to "Park Avenue Synagogue" in 1923. In 1927, the present Moorish-style building on East 87th Street was constructed. By the 1930s, the congregation changed its affiliation from Reform Judaism to Conservative in order to accommodate the merger of the congregation with several other congregations containing large numbers of Eastern European Jews.

In July 2008 senior rabbi Elliot J. Cosgrove became leader of the synagogue. In 2009, Azi Schwartz joined as senior cantor. In July 2013, rabbis Neil Zuckerman and Ethan Witkovsky joined the team. The congregation has been led by notable rabbis including Milton Steinberg and Judah Nadich.

== Architecture ==
The synagogue's grand Moorish-style sanctuary on East 87th Street was dedicated on March 27, 1927, in a ceremony attended by then-mayor Jimmy Walker. The ornate building was added onto in 1954 and again in 1980, with a six-story structure extending west to Madison Avenue.

In 2014, Park Avenue Synagogue undertook a renovation and expansion led by MBB Architects and Judaica artist Amy Reichert, beginning with a master plan for the 87th Street facilities and a newly acquired building on 89th Street. The Eli M. Black Lifelong Learning Center, located in a 1912 Neoclassical townhouse, was dedicated in 2017. The main synagogue house on 87th Street, re-dedicated in 2019, was renovated to include community gathering areas, two new dedicated prayer spaces, a glassed-in stair, and the display of modern stained-glass panels designed by American artist Adolf Gottlieb.

== Notable members ==
- Nancy Abramson, cantor
- Adam Leitman Bailey, attorney
- Eli M. Black, businessman
- Maurice Bloch, politician
- Kate Bolduan, CNN anchor
- Alan N. Cohen, businessman
- Max Helfman, cantor
- Ralph Lauren, designer
- Judah Nadich, rabbi
- Ben Platt, actor
- Steven Price, businessman
- Adolph Moses Radin, rabbi
- Menachem Z. Rosensaft, attorney
- Nelson Ruttenberg, lawyer and politician
- Azi Schwartz, cantor
- Milton Steinberg, rabbi
