= Metzudat Ze'ev =

Israeli office building

- מצודת זאב
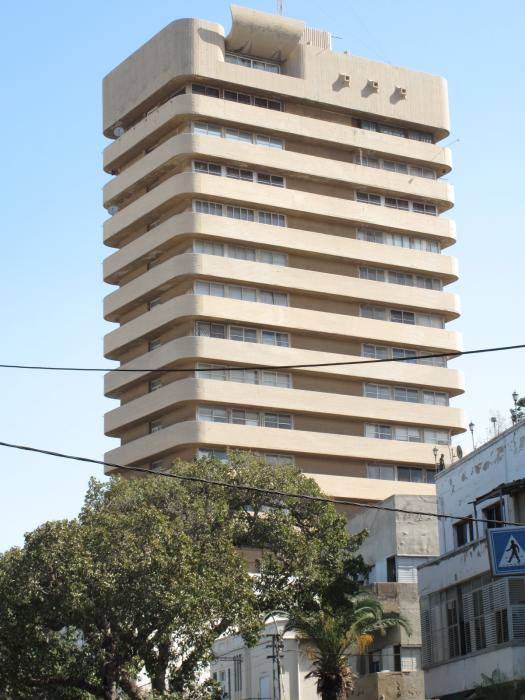
- Metzudat Ze'ev, a view from King George Street, Tel Aviv
- Interactive map of the Metzudat Ze'ev area
- Alternative names: Beit Jabotinsky, HaMetzuda

General information
- Status: Completed
- Location: 38 King George Street, Tel Aviv, Israel
- Coordinates: 32°4′22.56″N 34°46′29.85″E
- Groundbreaking: 1936
- Completed: 1963

Height
- Height: 60m

Design and construction
- Architect: Mordechai Ben-Horin
- Known for: Headquarters of the Likud party and various Zionist organizations

Metzudat Ze'ev (Hebrew: מצודת זאב, lit. "Ze'ev's fortress / stronghold"), also known as Beit Jabotinsky (House of Jabotinsky, בית ז'בוטינסקי) or HaMetzuda (המצודה, lit. "the fortress / stronghold") is an office building on 38 King George Street in Tel Aviv, Israel. The building is known for hosting the main staff of the Likud party, for which it is sometimes used as a metonym. The current building was designed by Mordechai Ben Hurin.

== History ==
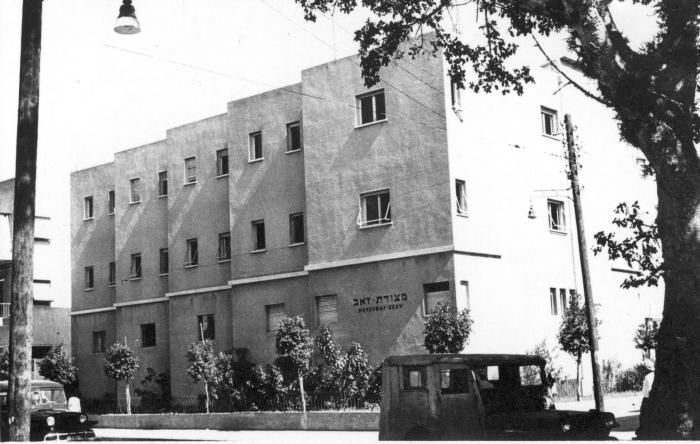
Metzudat Ze'ev before the construction of the tower

Metzudat Ze'ev is one of the oldest towers in Tel Aviv. It is built on the site of the shack that, during the 1930s, served as the headquarters of the Revisionist Zionism movement, Betar youth movement, and as the secret meeting place of the Irgun fighters.

In 1936, these movements consolidated a plan for a new building. The building's architect was Mordechai Ben-Horin. Built in a Brutalist style, its construction lasted until 1963. Upon completion, at 60 metres (200 ft), it was one of the tallest buildings in Tel Aviv.

The building is named after the founder of the Revisionist Zionism movement, Ze'ev Jabotinsky, and served as the headquarters of the Herut party headed by Menachem Begin, the predecessor of the Likud party.

When it was still a three-floor building, the Betar youth conducted their meetings in the inner courtyard, where a big mural slogan stated: "The Betar Bow has not turned back, and the sword-head of Betar shall not return in vain, Amen!"

On the night of the 1977 "political upheaval", when for the first time in Israel's history, the right wing won an election, Menachem Begin delivered his victory speech to an audience of party activists in the Independence Hall of the building.

Today, the building houses the Likud party's staff, the Betar movement, the Herut Women organization, the Mishkei Herut Beitar settlement movement, the Jabotinsky Institute in Israel and Jabotinsky Museum, the Irgun Museum and the Partisans and Fighters Museum. The rest is occupied by businesses.

== See also ==
- Architecture of Israel
