= Naftali Herstik =

Hungarian-born Israeli chazzan (1947–2024)

Naftali Herstik נפתלי הרשטיק
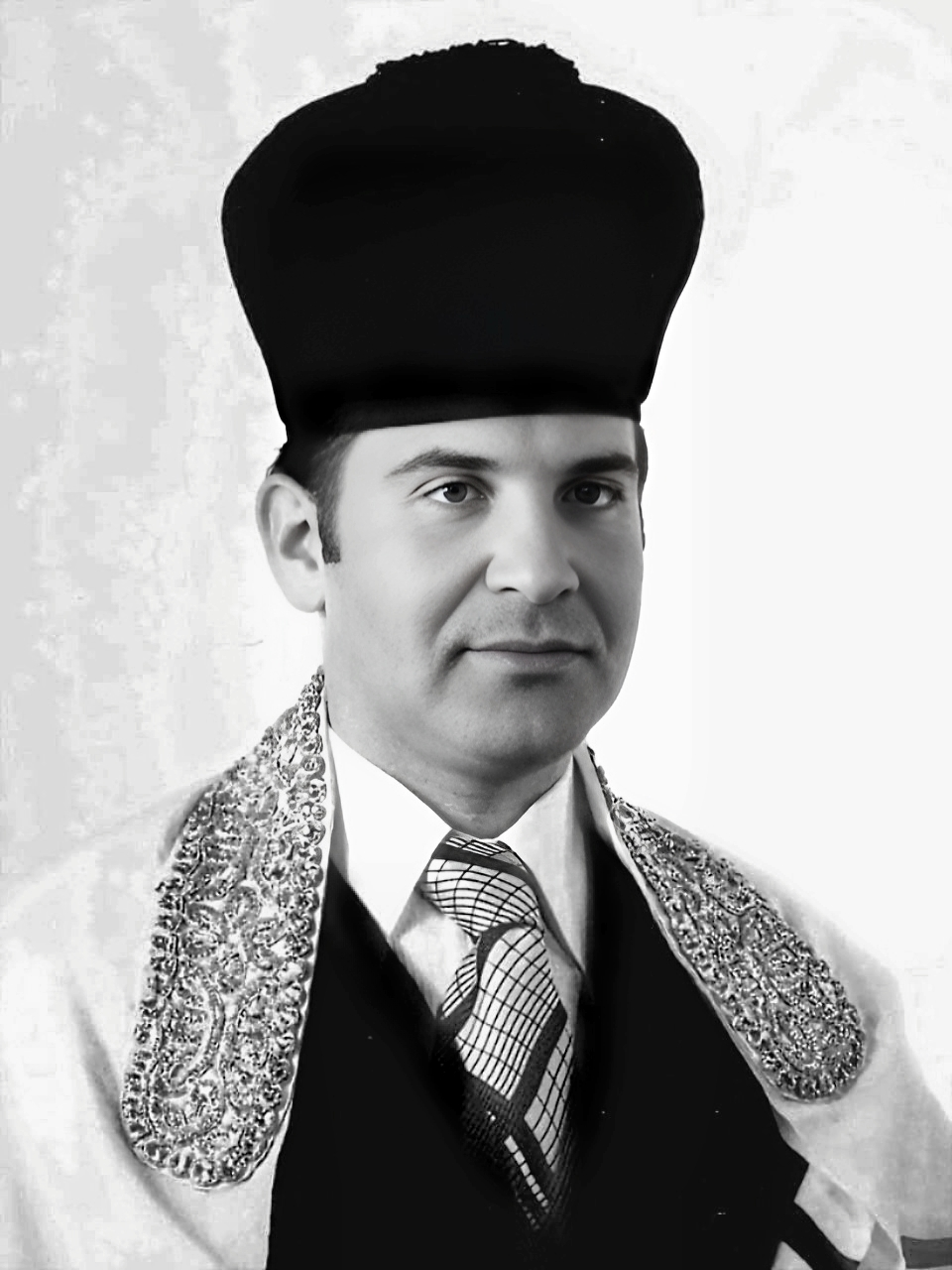

Personal life
- Born: 24 March 1947 Salgótarján, Hungary
- Died: 1 September 2024 (aged 77) Ra'anana, Israel

Religious life
- Religion: Judaism
- Synagogue: Great Synagogue of Jerusalem
- Position: Chief Cantor
- Began: 1981
- Ended: 2008

Naftali Herstik (Hebrew: נפתלי הרשטיק; 24 March 1947 – 1 September 2024) was a Hungarian-born Israeli ḥazzan, who served as Chief Cantor of the Great Synagogue of Jerusalem. He was regarded as an authority on central European Ashkenazy melodic liturgy.

== Early life and education ==
Naftali Herstik was born into a Jewish family in Salgótarján, Hungary in 1947. He was descended from a long line of cantors and rabbis.

Herstik came with his family to Israel at the age of three. His first teacher was his father, Moshe Menachem Herstik, who taught him the basics of ḥazzanut. He was recognized as a cantorial prodigy from his early childhood. Subsequently, he studied with Cantors Leib Glantz, Shelomo Ravitz, and Moshe Koussevitzky.

== Career ==
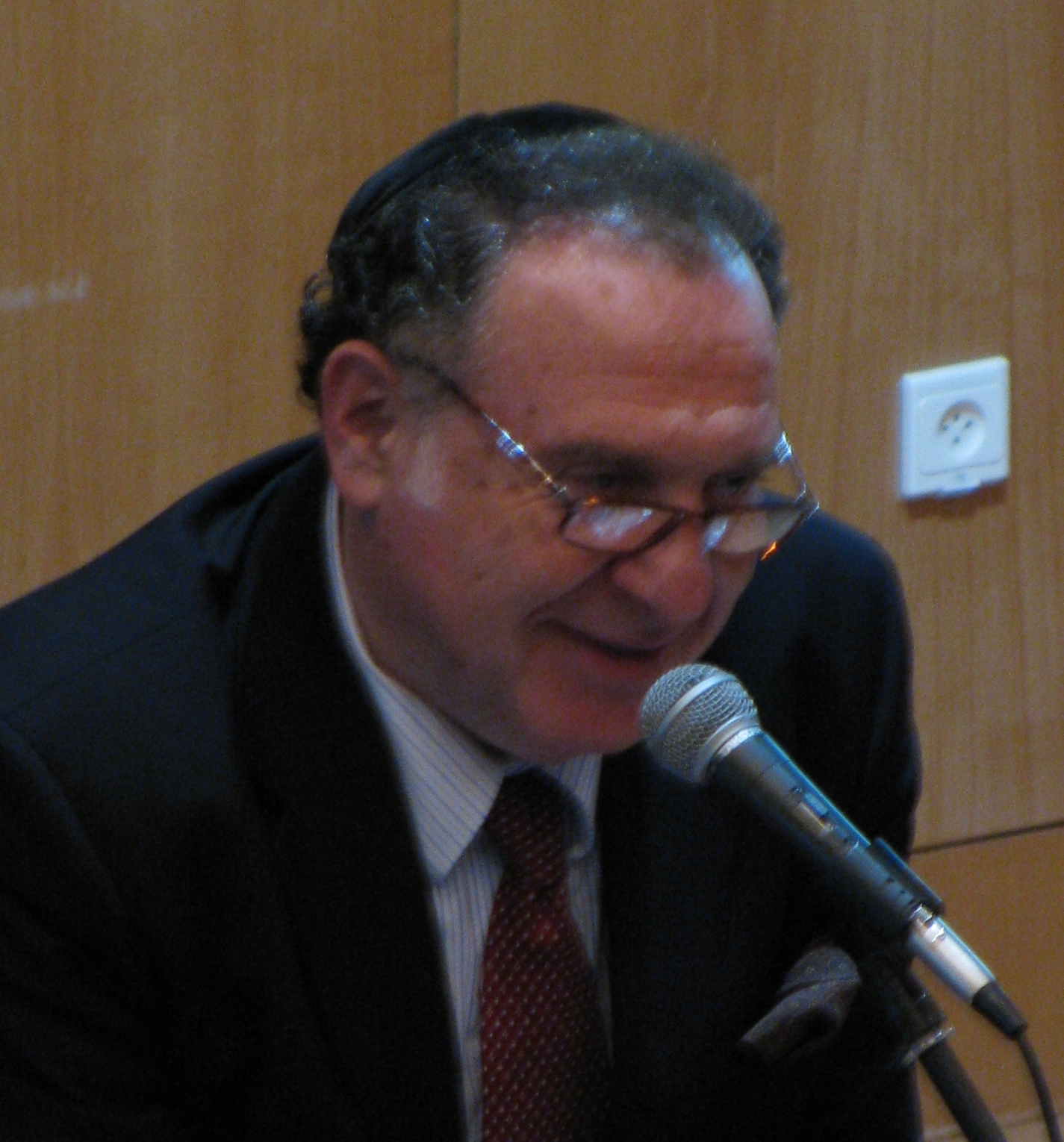
Herstik in 2009

Cantor Herstik served as the Cantor of the Finchley United Synagogue in London from 1972 to 1979, while simultaneously studying at the Royal College of Music. In 1981, he was appointed Chief Cantor of the Jerusalem Great Synagogue, a position he held until 31 December 2008.

In 1984, Hershtik, alongside Cantors Moshe Stern, Elli Jaffe and Tzvi Talmon, established an academy dedicated to preserving and teaching the cantorial arts. Eventually becoming the Tel Aviv Cantorial Institute, the academy operated out of Heichal Shlomo for three years, before moving to Tel Aviv in 1987. In 1991, the Institute came under the auspices of the municipality of Tel Aviv, and Herstik was appointed its artistic director and later general director. A number of prominent cantors have studied at the Institute, including Yitzchak Meir Helfgot, David Weinbach, Moshe Haschel, Azi Schwartz, and Gideon Zelermyer.

Throughout his career, Hershtik performed with the London Festival Orchestra, the London Mozart Players, the Jerusalem Symphony Orchestra, the Prague Symphony Orchestra, the Israel Philharmonic Orchestra, the Zurich Chamber Orchestra, and various choirs.

== Style ==
Cantor Herstik's cantorial style bears a Western European influence. He frequently incorporated compositions by Louis Lewandowski, Moshe Kraus, Salomon Sulzer and Samuel Alman, and participated in concerts in Europe and Israel dedicated to their compositions. Herstik is also known for his interpretations of the works of Cantor Yossele Rosenblatt. He also wrote a number of original compositions.

== Death ==
Herstik died of kidney disease at his home in Ra'anana on 1 September 2024, at the age of 77. His wife Elka (née Klein) and their five children survived him.

== Selected discography ==
- Prayers from Jerusalem (1985)
- The Danzig Tradition (1987)
- The Koenigsberg Tradition (1987)
- The Best of Naftali Herstik (1994)
- Sound of Prayer (1997)
- Jerusalem of Prayer (1997)
- Jerusalem Great Synagogue Choir (1997)
- One Family (2003)
- Shirei Yosef - Songs of Yossele (2003)
