= Leonardo Plaza Hotel Jerusalem =

Hotel in Jerusalem

Coordinates: 31°46′35.03″N 35°13′3.72″E

Leonardo Plaza Jerusalem Hotel
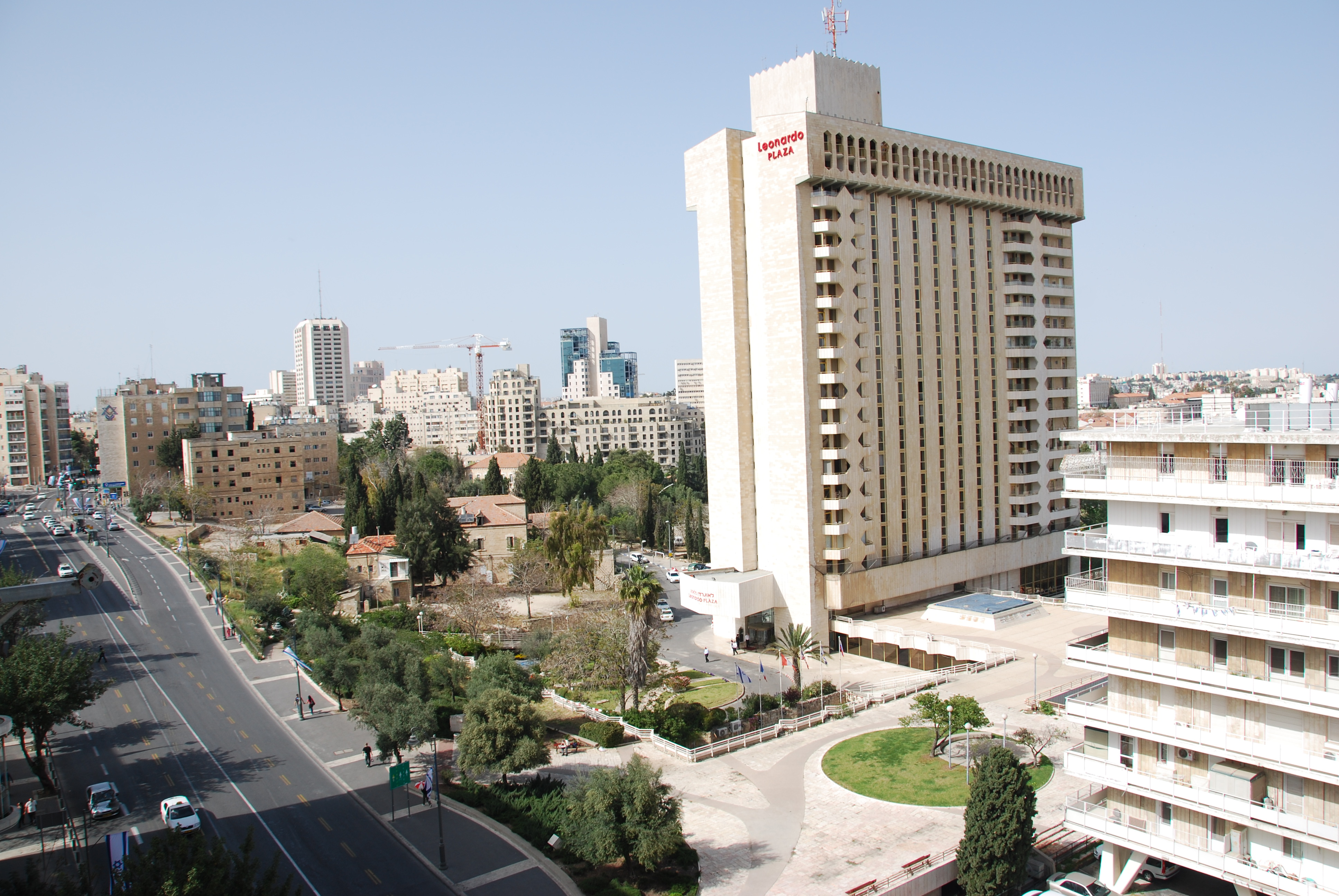
- Interactive map of the Leonardo Plaza Jerusalem Hotel area

General information
- Location: 47 King George Street; Jerusalem 91076 Israel
- Opening: 1973

Technical details
- Floor count: 22

Design and construction
- Architect: Mordechai Ben-Horin

Other information
- Number of restaurants: 3

Leonardo Plaza Jerusalem Hotel is a luxury hotel located in central Jerusalem on King George Street. The hotel is across the street from Heichal Shlomo and the Jerusalem Great Synagogue.

== History ==
Leonardo Plaza Jerusalem Hotel, overlooking Independence Park, was one of the first hotels to be built in West Jerusalem after the Six-Day War. Construction began in 1968. The architect of the 22-story Jerusalem stone-clad tower, which changed the city skyline, was Mordechai Ben-Horin. The hotel, which includes apartments, was developed by partners Ludwig Jesselson and Hermann Merkin. The hotel has 279 rooms and 2 restaurants. It opened in 1973 as the Jerusalem Plaza Hotel, operated by Canadian Pacific Hotels. It joined Sheraton Hotels and Resorts in 1986 and was named the Sheraton Jerusalem Plaza Hotel until 2008. From 2008–2016, it was named the Leonardo Plaza Hotel Jerusalem. The hotel was briefly associated with Herods Hotels, part of Fattal Group, from 2016–2017 as the Herods Hotel Jerusalem. It then reverted to the Leonardo Plaza name in 2017.

== See also ==
- Tourism in Israel
