= Dizengoff Center =

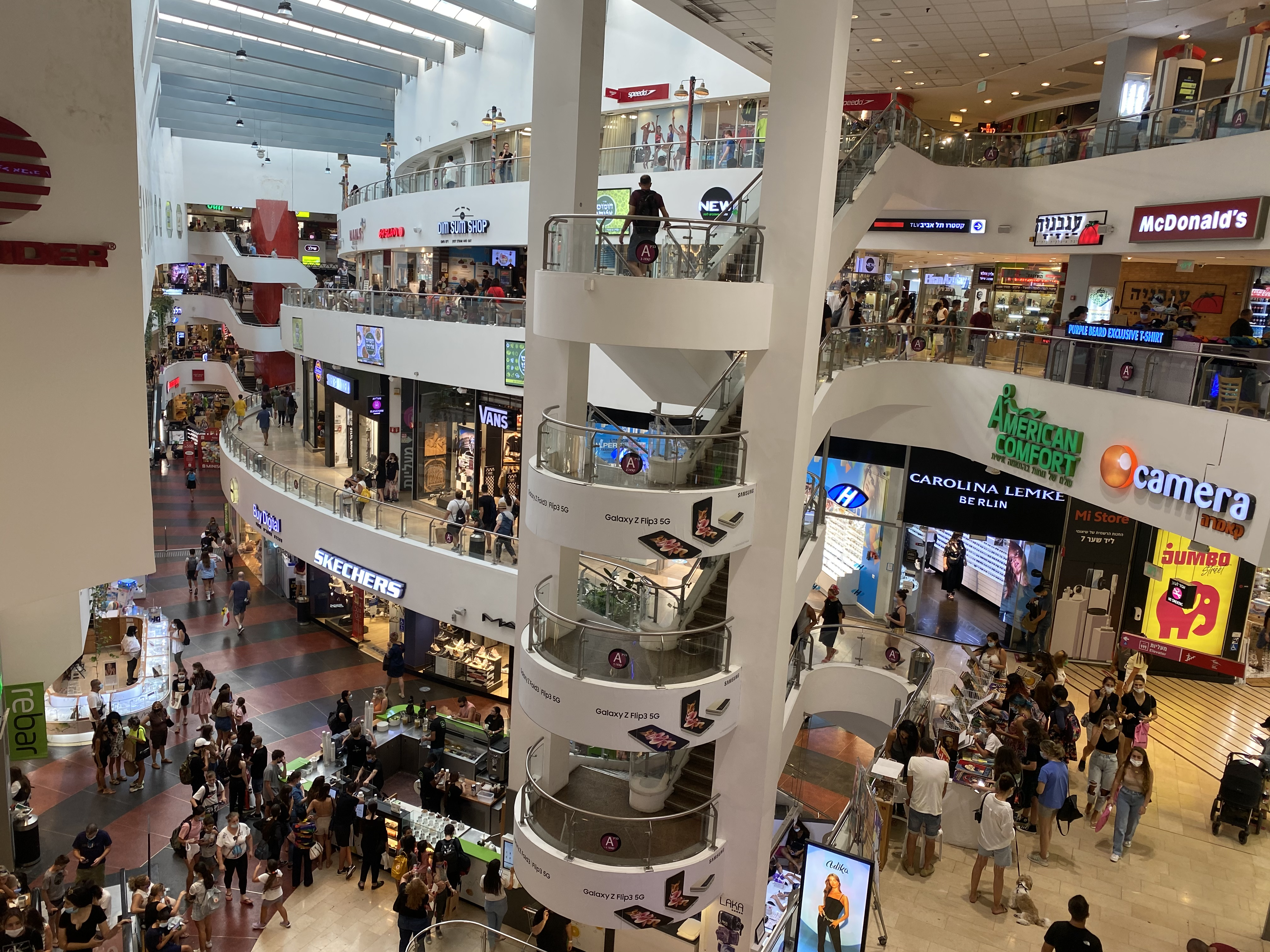
- Location: Tel Aviv, Israel
- Coordinates: 32°4′30.73″N 34°46′29.42″E
- Opened: 1983
- Architect: Yitzhak Yashar; Aliza Toledo; Mordechai Ben-Horin
- Num. of stores: about 420

Dizengoff Center (Hebrew: דיזנגוף סנטר) is a shopping mall at the intersection of Dizengoff Street and King George Street in Tel Aviv, Israel. The mall is named for Meir Dizengoff, the first mayor of Tel Aviv.

== History ==
Dizengoff Center, designed by Israeli architect Yitzhak Yashar, was Israel's first mall. The center was built on the site of the Nordiya neighborhood. Construction began in 1972, and the first store opened five years later in 1977. The rest of the mall was finished in 1983.

On 4 March 1996, during the Jewish holiday of Purim, the Dizengoff Center suicide bombing outside Dizengoff Center killed 13 people, many of them youngsters in costume.

On 13 July 2022, the first Lego store in Israel opened in Dizengoff Center.

== Overview ==
The mall has around 420 stores, one movie theater (Lev Dizengoff, with 6 screens), restaurants, an internet café, a design center holding exhibitions from around the world (Soho), specialty stores (comic books, video games, gadgets, stamp-collecting, posters), a rooftop swimming pool and two gyms. The mall is divided into two parts and straddles both sides of Dizengoff Street with the two parts linked by skywalks and underground passages. The underground parts of Dizengoff Center include a bomb shelter fully equipped with toilets and showers using underground aquifer waters, and rooms for families.

The mall also hosts weekly events. Every Friday (except for Jewish holidays) the mall hosts the "Food Fair", Israel's largest food festival, with foods from a large variety of cuisines. On Thursdays and Fridays it hosts a designers boutique, which includes fashion and jewelry from 40 designers. Also on Thursdays and Fridays, it hosts an "alternative therapies fair."

The mall is visited by about 40,000 people on weekdays, around 45,000 people on Fridays, and about 80,000 during the holidays.

=== Towers ===
Two towers were built upon the mall – a residential tower above the northern part of the mall commonly referred to as the "Dizengoff Tower," and an office tower above the south-western part of the mall commonly referred to as "Top Tower". The mall also has a big underground parking lot.

Dizengoff Tower was commissioned by developer Abraham Pilz and Azorim, and designed by the architect Mordechai Ben Horin. The building was inspired by the shape of a rose. It has 21 floors and stands 116 m (381 ft) tall. The architect wanted to maximize the perimeter of the building and allow each apartment to have a view in two directions, hence the zig-zag shape. The original design called for 320 small apartments of approximately 50 m^{2} (540 sq ft), but many were combined, for an eventual total of 226. The floor area is 1,110 m^{2} (11,900 sq ft). An expansion to the base of the tower was approved in the 2010s, but the plan was rejected following an appeal.

== Gallery ==
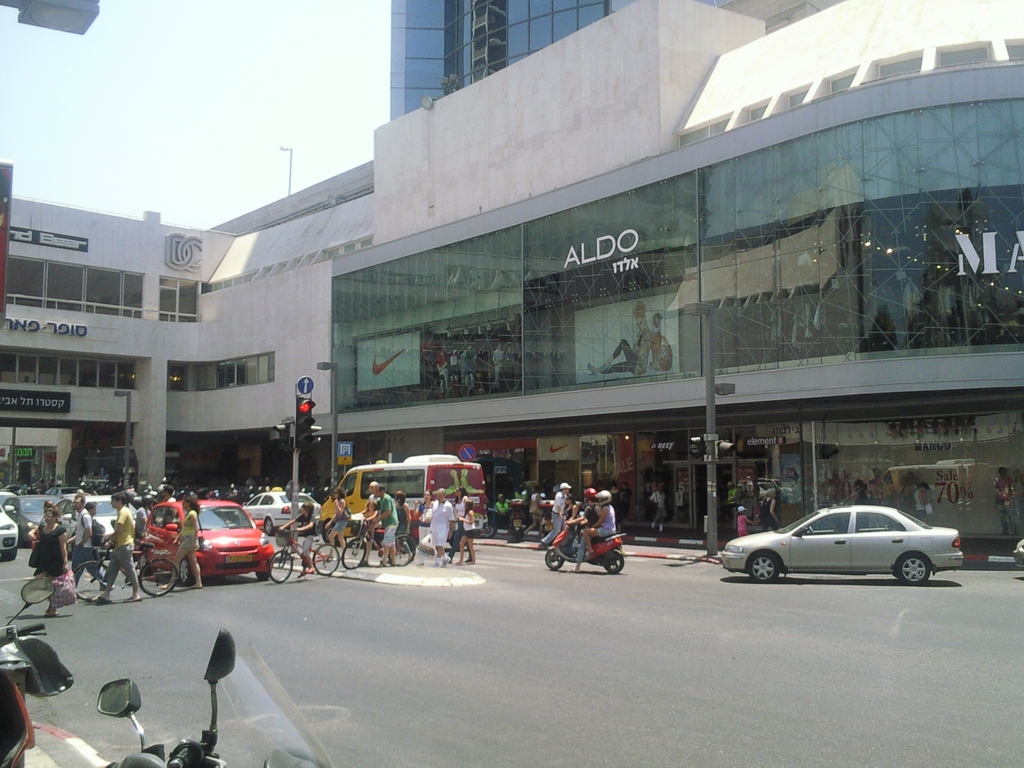
Dizengoff Center northern façade

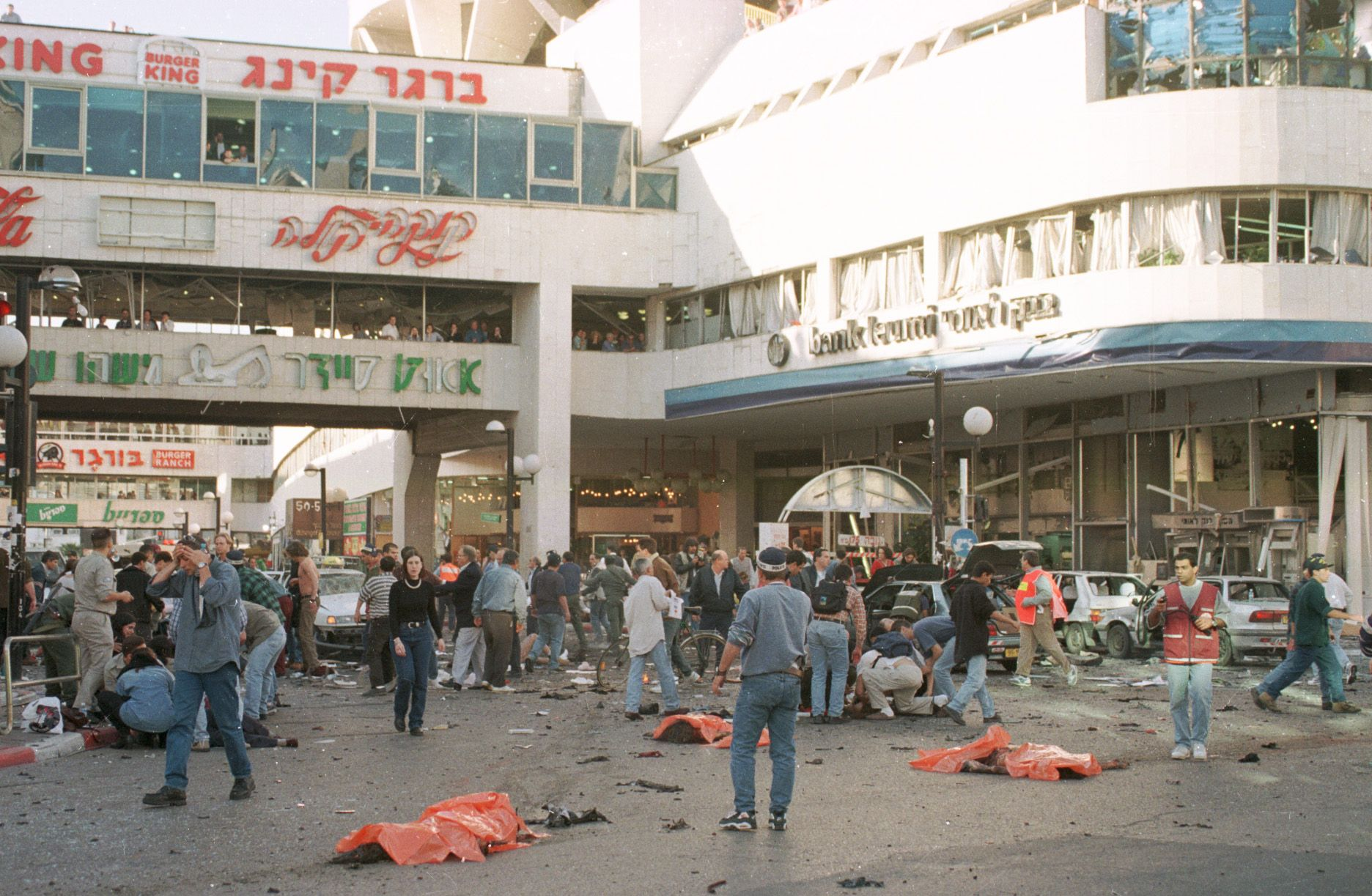
Dizengoff Center after a Suicide Bombing in the area, 1996

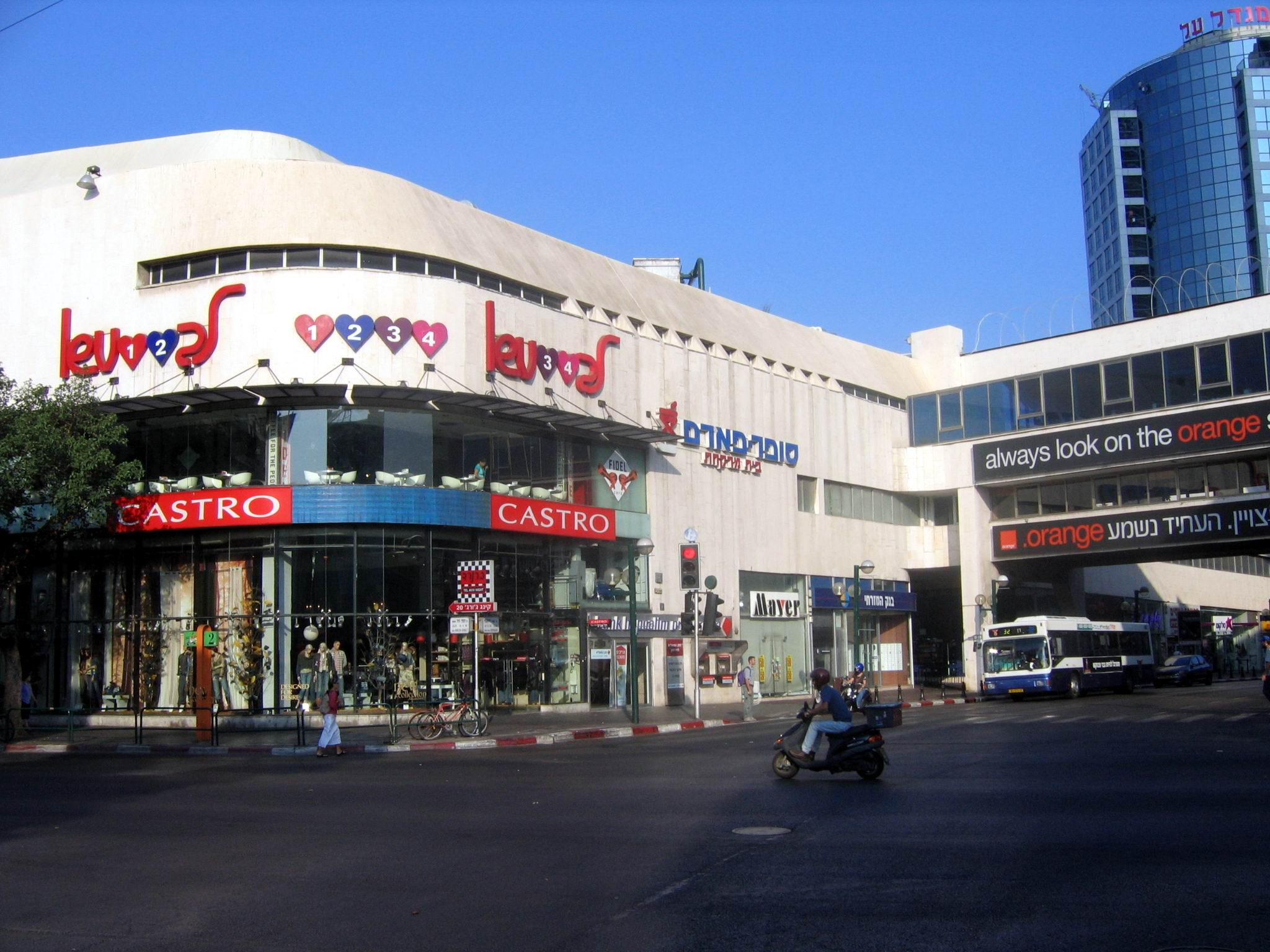
Dizengoff Center - outside eastern view

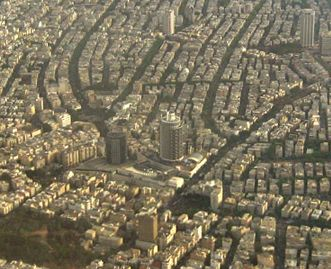
Aerial view of the mall and surrounding area

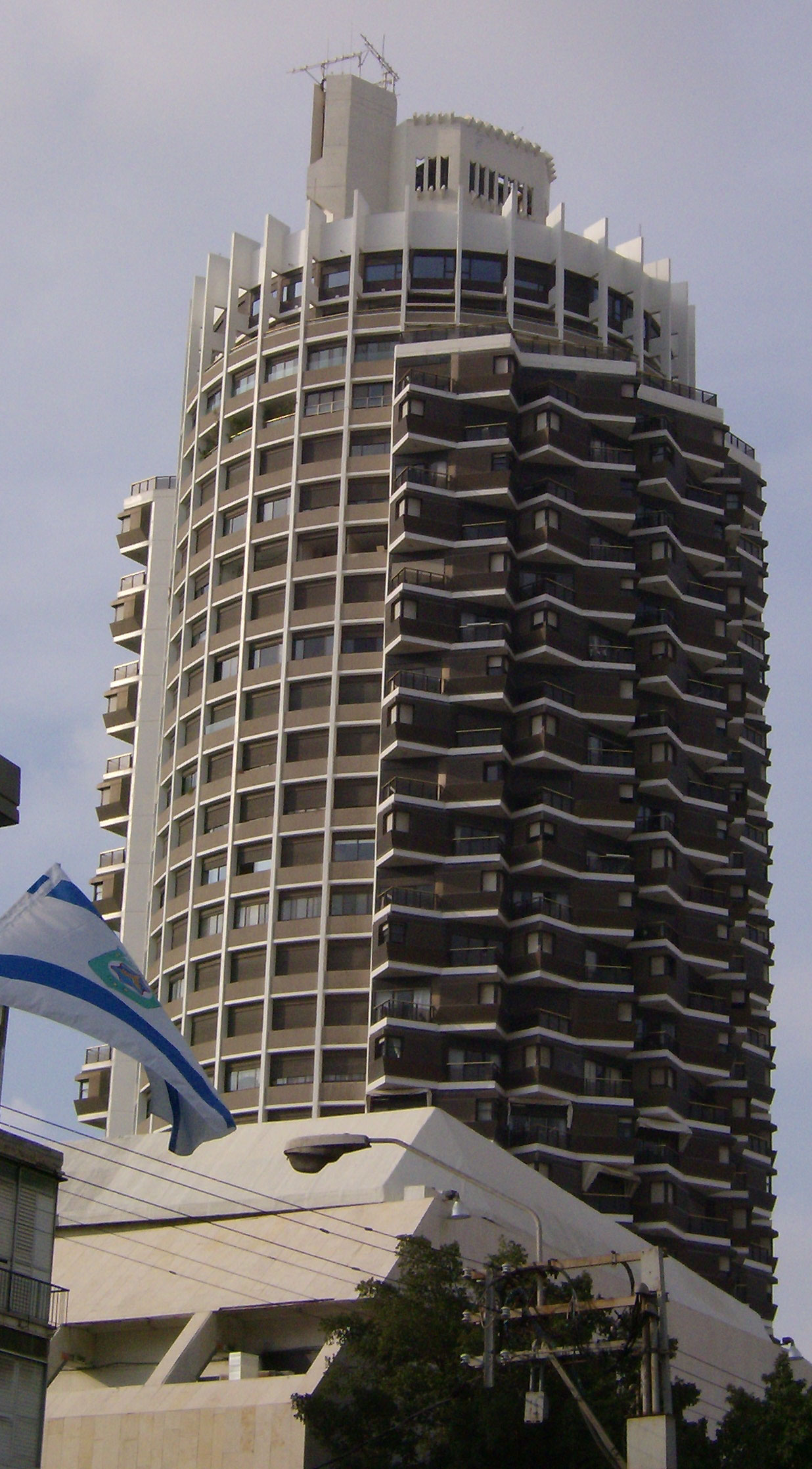
The Dizengoff Tower

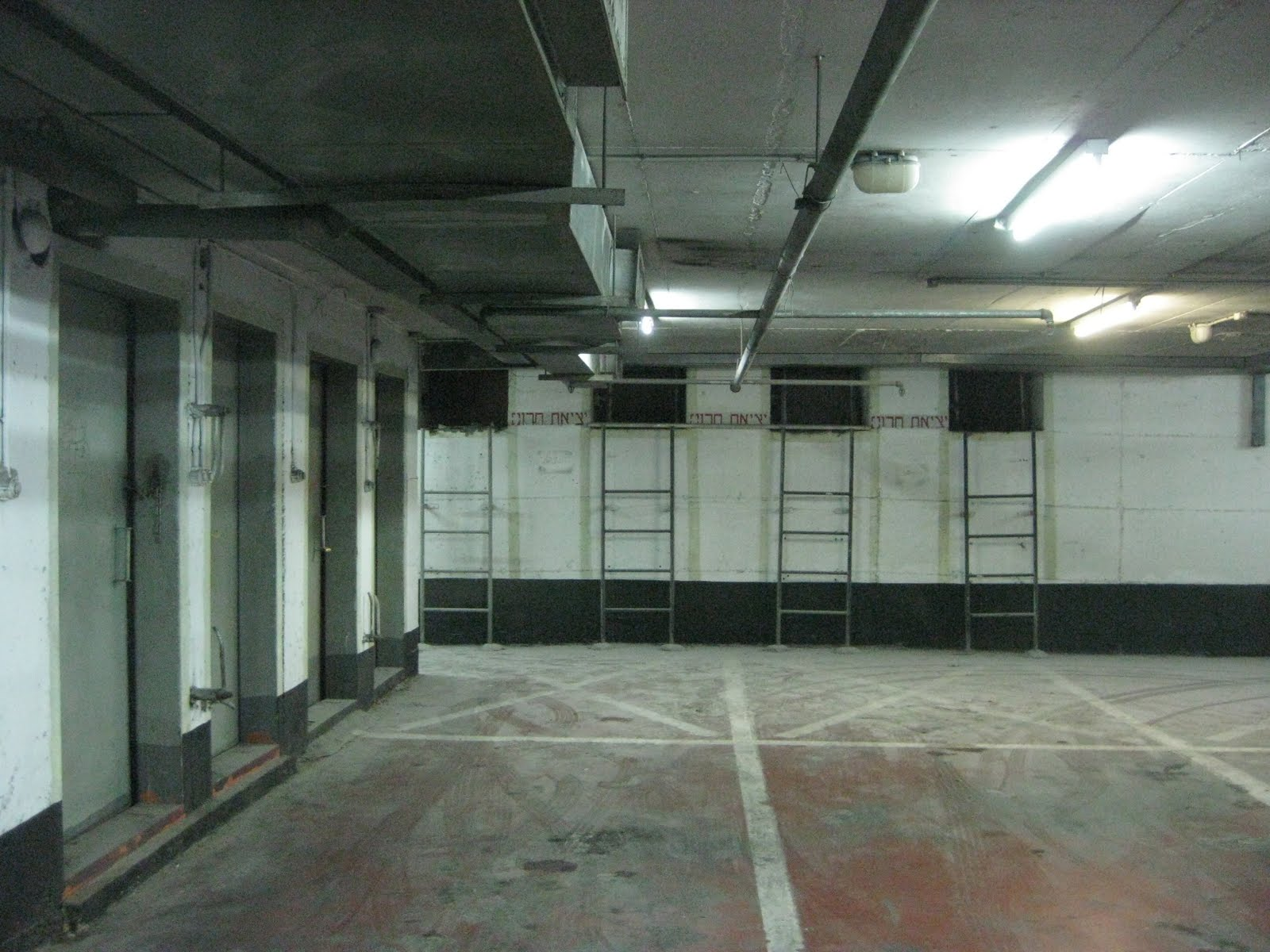
Dizengoff Center's underground bomb shelters

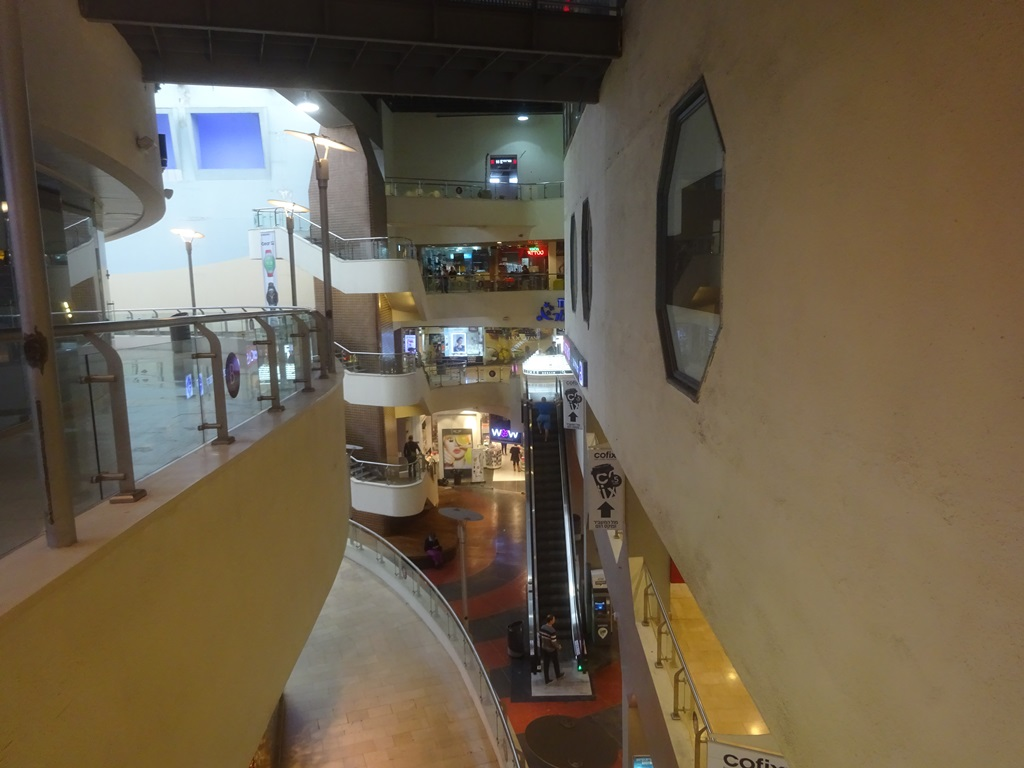
Inside view of Dizengoff Center

== See also ==
- Azrieli Center
- List of shopping malls in Israel
