= MBB Architects =

American architectural design firm

Practice information
- Firm type: Architectural design
- Partners: Mary Burnham, Jeffrey Murphy, Sara Grant, Taylor Aikin
- Founded: 1998 (Murphy, Burnham & Buttrick Architects)
- Location: New York City, United States

Significant works and honors
- Buildings: St. Patrick's Cathedral Renovation; Park Avenue Synagogue Renovation; Trinity Church Wall Street Renovation; St. Hilda's & St. Hugh's School Renovation

Website
- www.mbbarch.com

MBB Architects is an architectural design firm based in New York City, known for the preservation and renewal of historical and culturally significant buildings such as St. Patrick's Cathedral, Trinity Church Wall Street, and Park Avenue Synagogue. Founding partners Jeffrey Murphy, Mary Burnham, and Harold Buttrick (formerly of Buttrick, White and Burtis) established the firm as Murphy, Burnham & Buttrick in 1998. Now a women-owned firm, MBB had, as of 2020, approximately 30 employees.

== Notable projects ==
In 2015, MBB completed a 10-year, $177 million restoration and renovation of St. Patrick's Cathedral in midtown Manhattan, including the addition of a geothermal heating and cooling system. New York Magazine's architecture critic, Justin Davidson, wrote that “The result is so conspicuously glorious that it makes Rockefeller Center look suddenly shabby by comparison.” According to Davidson, “The most impressive tasks aren’t even visible: replacing the entire cooling and heating system and hooking them up to geothermal wells that have been sunk up to 2,200 feet below Manhattan’s asphalt crust.”

In 2025, the New York City Landmarks Preservation Commission moved to new offices and public meeting spaces in the historic Home Life Building, renovated by MBB to include a wood-ceilinged hearing room and "pointillist supergraphics of notable landmarks on conference room walls." One critic praised the "light and internal transparency" of the public areas The chair of the commission, Sarah Carroll, said the design "highlights how New York’s historic buildings can be thoughtfully updated to meet modern needs."

In 2021, the firm completed a three-year restoration and renovation of Trinity Church Wall Street, which The New York Times called “a shining example of stewardship.” In addition to restoring the historic interiors and uncovering hidden windows, the project improved the church's accessibility, acoustics and energy performance. According to Traditional Building Magazine, "One of the more innovative designs involves the ADA lift, which is seamlessly tucked behind a pair of movable sedilia chairs on the chancel." MBB also renovated the historic Park Avenue Synagogue in collaboration with Judaica expert Amy Reichert.

In 2017 the firm renovated the historic Billie Holiday Theatre in Brooklyn, which U.S. President Joe Biden later called "an incredible place" that is "nurturing a new generation of Black playwrights, performers." Notable education design projects include NYU Abu Dhabi Institute at 19 Washington Square North in New York City; Public School 330 in Queens, New York City, built around a glass-enclosed “gymnatorium”; a rooftop athletic center addition to the Grace Church School; an educational green roof at PS 41 Greenwich Village School; and the renovation and expansion of St. Hilda's & St. Hugh's School, where the firm "scrutinized every bit of space from basement to roof to maximize programmatic use."

The firm's 2003 Habitat for Humanity Row Houses in the Bronx were described as "well-designed, dignified and enhancing the urban streetscape" by The New York Times. Another civic housing design, a post-disaster module made of "mold-resistant boating and surfer materials," was selected as a finalist in a 2008 competition organized by New York City's Office of Emergency Management. The firm's design for a net zero energy library in California received an award from the American Institute of Architects, California. Sara Grant, a partner in the firm who works on inclusive design strategies, wrote in a 2023 op-ed, "When we set aside preconceptions about differently abled and non-neurotypical learners, we discover new possibilities."
