= Judah Nadich =

American Conservative rabbi

Captain Rabbi Judah Nadich
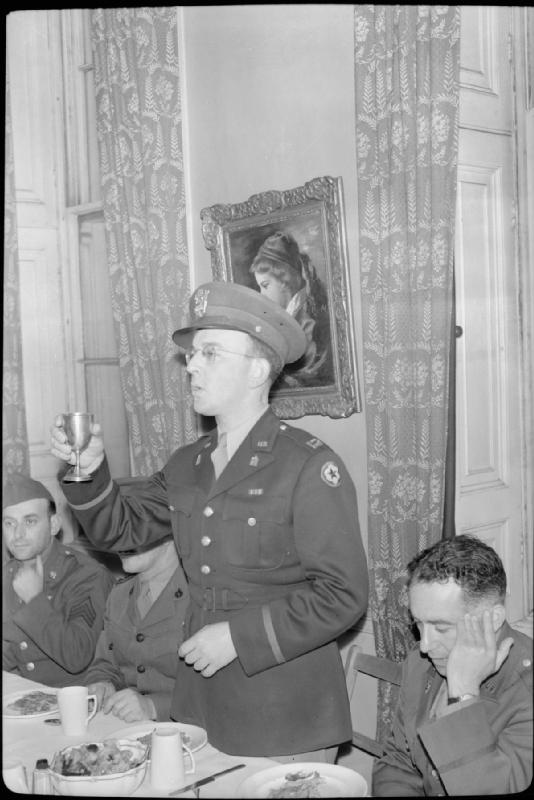
- Captain Nadich (standing centre), offering the Kiddush; photo from his wartime service in Europe.
- Born: Judah Nadich; May 13, 1912; Baltimore, Maryland, U.S.
- Died: August 26, 2007 (aged 95); New York City, New York, U.S.
- Education: City College of New York; Columbia University (M.A., 1936); Jewish Theological Seminary of America (ordination)
- Occupations: Rabbi; U.S. Army chaplain
- Years active: 1930s–1987
- Known for: Senior Jewish chaplain in Europe (U.S. Army) during liberation of Nazi concentration camps; Rabbi of Park Avenue Synagogue (1957–1987); President, Rabbinical Assembly
- Office: Rabbi, Park Avenue Synagogue
- Term: 1957–1987
- Spouse: Martha Hadassah Ribalow (m. 1947)
- Parent(s): Isaac Nadich and Lena Nathanson Nadich
- Military career
- Branch: United States Army
- Rank: Captain (served as senior Jewish chaplain in Europe, 1945)
- Conflicts: World War II; liberation of Nazi concentration camps (1945)

Rabbi Judah Nadich (May 13, 1912 – August 26, 2007), was an American Conservative rabbi, who served congregations in Buffalo, New York and Chicago, Illinois, and later was the U.S. Army's senior Jewish chaplain in Europe while Allied forces were liberating Nazi concentration camps, and later was the President of the Rabbinical Assembly, the international association of Conservative rabbis.

He was born in Baltimore, Maryland, the eldest child of Isaac and Lena Nathanson Nadich, who had emigrated from Russia in the early 1900s. His father owned a grocery store. Rabbi Nadich's mother died when he was 7, and he and his two sisters were raised by their stepmother, Nettie Gifter Nadich, an immigrant from Lithuania. Isaac and Nettie also had a daughter together.

In 1936, four years after graduating from City College of New York, Rabbi Nadich earned a master's degree in history from Columbia University and was ordained at the Jewish Theological Seminary of America. He led Conservative congregations in Buffalo and in Chicago before enlisting in the Army as a chaplain in 1942.

He was the Army's senior Jewish chaplain in Europe in April 1945 as advancing U.S. and British forces liberated Nazi concentration camps in Germany.

Eisenhower, the commander of Allied forces in Western Europe, named Rabbi Nadich to offer advice on how to cope with hundreds of thousands of displaced persons being kept in military custody in squalid conditions little better than the camps they had survived.

In a 1953 book, Eisenhower and the Jews, Rabbi Nadich wrote that he and others persuaded the Allied command to abandon a policy requiring the displaced to be returned to their home countries.

In 1947, Rabbi Nadich married Martha Hadassah Ribalow, the daughter of Menachem Ribalow, founder and editor of the first Hebrew weekly in America, Hadoar, and Rose Ribalow. He served at Congregation Kehillath Israel in Brookline, Massachusetts, for 10 years, and then, from 1957 until his retirement in 1987, he served as rabbi of New York's Park Avenue Synagogue. There, Nadich "helped develop a strong educational after-school program, which is now called the Rabbi Judah Nadich Hebrew High School."

As President of the Rabbinical Assembly, in 1974, he called on the movement's Law Committee to "give careful consideration" to his proposal to admit ordained women, which eventually occurred in 1985. He died in New York City on August 26, 2007, at the age of 95.
