= Women Cantors Network =

Jewish clergy organization

Women Cantors' Network
- Founded: 1982
- Tax ID no.: 223575617
- Purpose: Community Improvement, Capacity Building, Promotion of Business
- Location: Natick, Massachusetts
- Region served: U.S., Canada, Israel, United Kingdom, France, Germany
- Members: 300+
- Key people: President Stephanie Weishaar; Executive Vice President Rebecca Schwartz; Communications Vice President Joshana Erenberg; Corresponding Secretary Lois Kittner; Recording Secretary Linda Sweenie; Treasurer Elaine Moise
- Website: www.womencantors.net

Women Cantors Network is an international outreach support group for female cantors, which works for the nationwide recognition and employment of qualified female cantors. It was founded in 1982 by Cantor Deborah Katchko-Zimmerman, who was the granddaughter of a prominent cantor (Adolph Katchko), and who was trained privately by her father, also a cantor. At the first meeting of what became the Women Cantors Network, only twelve women attended. In 1983 the Women Cantors Network began regularly publishing a newspaper, in 1993 its constitution and bylaws were written, in 1997 it began to commission new Jewish music, and in 1998 it created an online list-serve network.

In 2011 the Women Cantors' Network had a piece commissioned for them honoring the Liberty Bell, which they performed at the National Museum of American Jewish History in Philadelphia, Pennsylvania. It was composed by cantor Lori Sumberg of Tucson, Arizona, and was called “Song of the Bell.”
