= Azi Schwartz =

Israeli-American cantor (born 1981)

- עזי שוורץ
- Born: September 1981 (aged 45); Israel
- Education: Yeshivat Har Etzion; Herzog College; Jerusalem Academy of Music and Dance; Mannes School of Music; Tel Aviv Cantorial Institute
- Occupations: Hazzan (cantor); singer
- Employer: Park Avenue Synagogue
- Style: Traditional Jewish music
- Spouse: Noa Schwartz
- Children: 4

Azi Schwartz (Hebrew: עזי שוורץ; born September 1981) is an Israeli-American Jewish hazzan (cantor), vocal performer, and recording artist. Born in Israel, he lives in New York City, where he serves as the senior cantor of Park Avenue Synagogue. Schwartz performs concerts internationally and is a teacher of cantorial music.

== Education ==
Before his musical career, Schwartz attended Yeshivat Har Etzion. He completed his military service as a soloist in the Israeli Defense Forces Rabbinical Troupe. Schwartz earned his undergraduate degree in teaching Jewish philosophy and Jewish studies from the Herzog College before studying at the Jerusalem Academy of Music and Dance. He received his master's degree in voice and conducting from the Mannes School of Music at The New School, and an MBA from the Sy Syms School of Business. Schwartz received his cantorial training at Tel Aviv Cantorial Institute, where he studied under Naftali Herstik.

== Professional accomplishments ==
Schwartz has performed at Madison Square Garden, for the United Nations, and on Capitol Hill. He was featured as a part of a trio on a PBS special titled "Cantors of New York". Schwartz performed a prayer for Pope Francis's visit to Ground Zero in 2015. He has performed at Carnegie Hall multiple times, including a duet with tenor Lawrence Brownlee. He played the cantor's role in the film Norman, featuring Richard Gere. His videos are popular on YouTube, with over 50 million views. During the COVID-19 pandemic in 2020, he led services for Park Avenue Synagogue through online livestreaming.

== Style ==
Schwartz is known for his virtuosic interpretations of Jewish traditional prayers and Hebrew songs, and mixing Jewish ritual music with contemporary melodies, with an intent of bringing new life to the tradition of Jewish liturgical music. He has gone viral on social media for performing traditional prayers to contemporary melodies, including performing "Adon Olam" to the tune of "You'll Be Back" from Hamilton and "For Forever" from Dear Evan Hansen, "L'dor Vador" to "We Are the Champions" by Queen, "We are Never Getting back to Egypt" to "We Are Never Ever Getting Back Together" by Taylor Swift, "Etz Chayim" to "As It Was" by Harry Styles, and "Ose Shalom" to the tune of "Shallow" by Lady Gaga and Bradley Cooper. He has performed with Broadway stars in New York, including performing a version of "Tomorrow" from Annie with Julie Benko for a program he co-produced called Hanukkah on Broadway.

== Personal life ==
Schwartz grew up in Israel. He was inspired to become a cantor through his grandfather, who was a cantor in Hungary. He enjoys riding motorcycles as a hobby. He is married to Noa Schwartz; together, they have four children.

== Discography ==
Sources:

- Israel: 75 Years of Music
- Yizkor: Music of Memory and Tribute
- Haggadah for Young Families
- Be The Light
- Siddur for Young Families
- Havdalah: Live from Jerusalem
- Heritage: Treasures of Jewish German Composers
- Moments of Awe: Music of the High Holy Days
- L'dor Vador
- Yihyu L'ratzon
- Mizmor Shir
- Hadesh Yameinu: New Music at Park Avenue Synagogue
- Shir Hadash: New Music at Park Avenue Synagogue
- Ahavat Olam: Jewish Romantic Music
- Ki Eshmerah Shabbat – Volume 1: Shabbat Morning
- Mahzor for Young Families: Rosh Hashanah and Yom Kippur
- Youth Machzor 2018
- Siddur for Youth
