= Moshe Stern =

Rabbi Moshe Stern (1914–1997) was a prominent Orthodox Jewish (Charedi) Rabbi in the 20th century. He was Dayan of Debrecen, Hungary and author of a halachic responsa sefer named Be'er Moshe. He survived Bergen Belsen during the Holocaust and after a brief stint in Buenos Aires, became Rabbi of Kahal Yesodei HaTorah in New York where he published Be'er Moshe.
