= Congregation Ahavath Torah =

Jewish synagogue in New Jersey, USA

- Location in Bergen County, New Jersey

Religion
- Affiliation: Modern Orthodox Judaism
- Ecclesiastical or organizational status: Synagogue
- Status: Active

Location
- Location: 240 Broad Avenue, Englewood, Bergen County, New Jersey
- Country: United States
- Interactive map of Congregation Ahavath Torah
- Coordinates: 40°52′59″N 73°58′24″W

Architecture
- Established: 1895 (as a congregation)
- Completed: 1958

Website
- ahavathtorah.org

Congregation Ahavath Torah is a Modern Orthodox synagogue located at 240 Broad Avenue, in Englewood, Bergen County, New Jersey, in the United States.

== History ==
The synagogue traces its roots back to 1895, and was the first synagogue in Bergen County, New Jersey. The first eight families in the congregation held services in each others homes after purchasing a Sefer Torah, later renting spaces on Armory Street and Durie Avenue. The first synagogue was built on an 18x30 feet property on Humphrey Street in 1911 when the synagogue reached a membership of fifty families. An old church on Englewood Avenue was purchased for the synagogue once this space couldn't sustain the growing congregation. The current building on Broad Avenue was built in 1958 to match the needs of the synagogue.

In 2016, it opened a mikveh with two pools. In 2017 it had about 750 families.

Among the Shabbat morning minyanim, the synagogue includes a Sephardic minyan known as the Benaroya Sephardic Center.
