= Heichal Shlomo =

Orthodox synagogue in Jerusalem

- Hebrew: היכל שְׁלֹמֹה
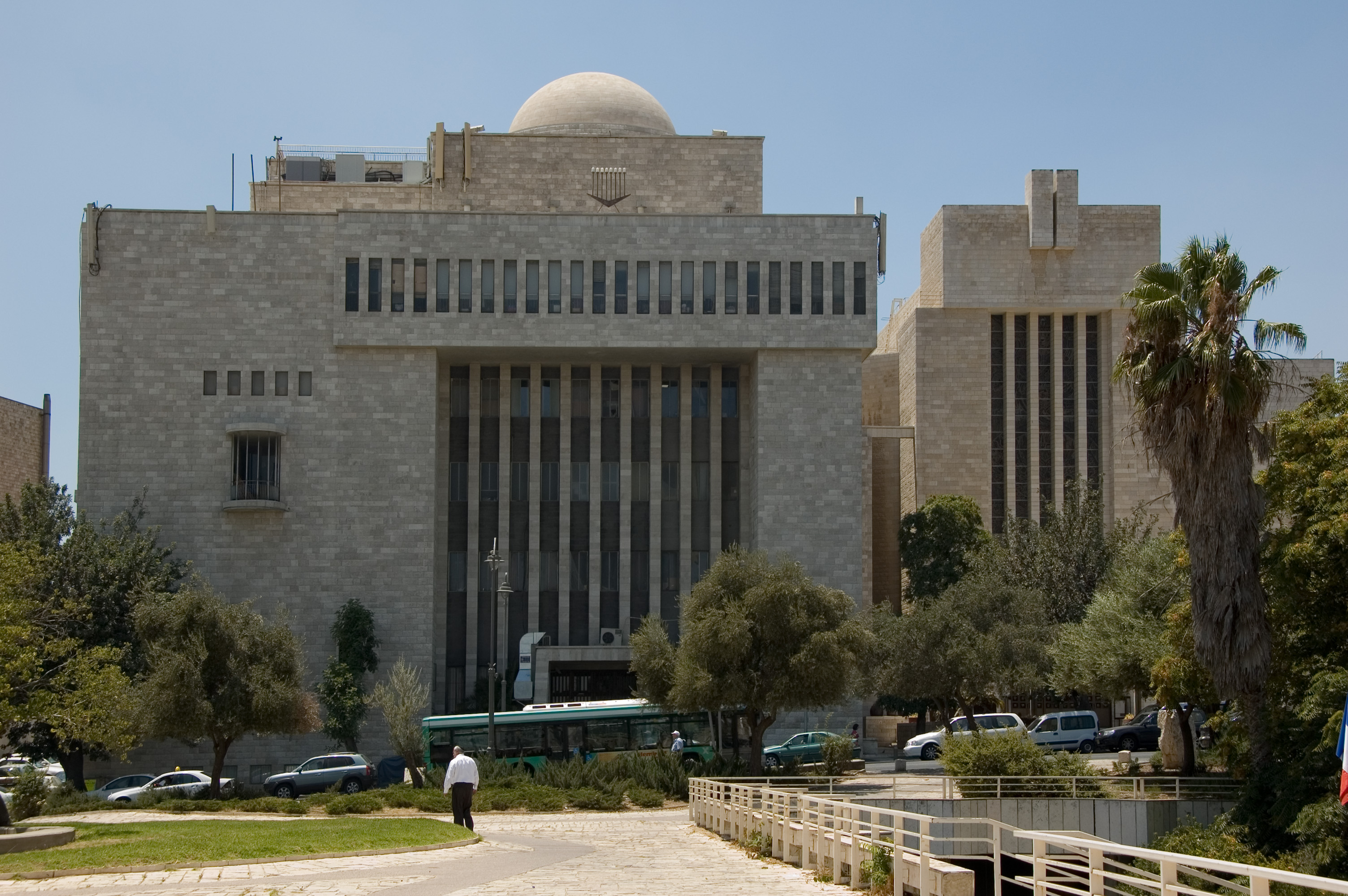
- Heichal Shlomo in 2009 (left), with the Great Synagogue (right)

- Location of the synagogue in Jerusalem

Religion
- Affiliation: Orthodox Judaism
- Ecclesiastical or organizational status: Synagogue; Jewish museum; Teacher's college
- Status: Active

Location
- Location: Jerusalem
- Country: Israel
- Interactive map of Heichal Shlomo
- Coordinates: 31°46′32.84″N 35°13′0.88″E

Architecture
- Architect: Alexander Friedman
- Type: Synagogue architecture
- Groundbreaking: 1953
- Completed: 1958
- Dome: One

Website
- hechalshlomo.org.il

The Heichal Shlomo (Hebrew: היכל שְׁלֹמֹה, romanized: Heikhal Shlomo, lit. 'Palace of Solomon'; hence Hekhal of Solomon) is a building, which houses a synagogue, Jewish museum and teacher's college, located opposite the Leonardo Plaza Hotel, on King George Street, Jerusalem, Israel.

The building served as the seat of the Chief Rabbinate of Israel until 1992. It now serves as the Jerusalem Campus of Herzog College for their Masters in Education program, and houses the Jewish Heritage Center and Museum of Jewish Art.

== History ==
The building was erected between 1953 and 1958, following plans by German-born architect Alexander Friedman, and was formally dedicated in May 1958.

The building has housed the Jewish Heritage Center and Jewish Art Museum since 1992.

The Renanim Synagogue was transferred from Padua together with its 18th-century Torah ark and bimah, and decorated with modern stained glass windows. The Entrance Gallery displays temporary exhibitions of Israeli artists. The museum displaying traditional and modern Jewish art in permanent and temporary exhibitions is named in honour of British Jewish philanthropist, Sir Isaac Wolfson.

Rabbi Yitzchok Zev Soloveitchik, the rabbi of Brisk, strongly discouraged entering the building, saying "every stone there is impure".

In 2009, Pope Benedict XVI paid a courtesy visit to Heichal Shlomo, where he met with the two Chief Rabbis of Jerusalem.

== Gallery ==
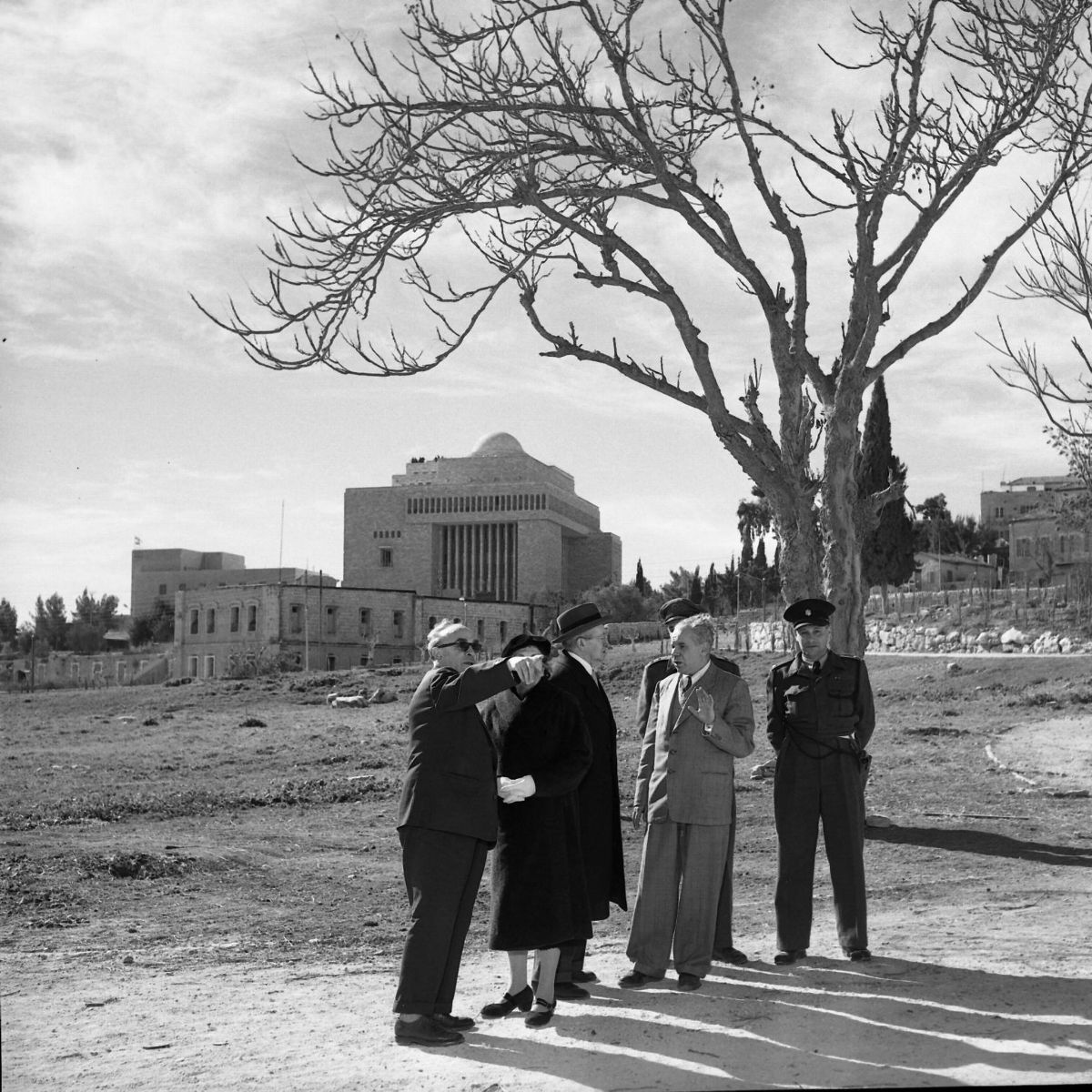
Mordechai Ish-Shalom and Yitzhak Ben-Zvi standing across from Heichal Shlomo, 1959

== See also ==
- History of the Jews in Israel
- List of synagogues in Israel
- Synagogues of Jerusalem
