= Jerusalem Great Synagogue =

Orthodox synagogue in Jerusalem

- Hebrew: בֵּית הַכְּנֶסֶת הַגָּדוֹל בּיְרוּשָׁלַיִם
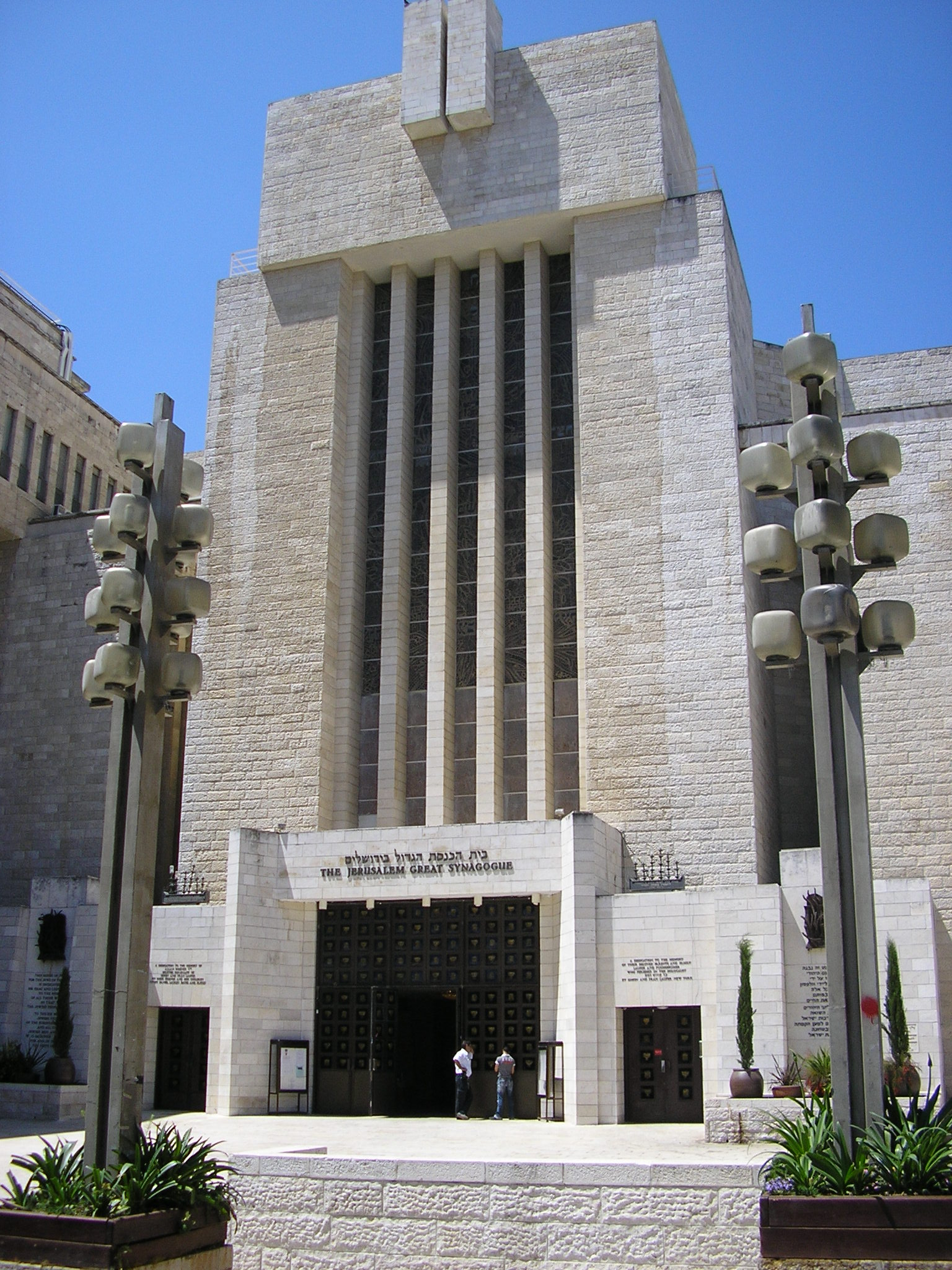
- The synagogue in 2007

- Location of the synagogue in Jerusalem

Religion
- Affiliation: Orthodox Judaism
- Rite: Nusach Ashkenaz; Nusach Sefard
- Ecclesiastical or organisational status: Synagogue
- Leadership: Grand Rabbi Y. A. Korff; Chief Rabbi Shlomo Amar; Chief Rabbi David Yosef; Chief Rabbi Kalman Meir Ber; Chief Rabbi Aryeh Stern; Malcolm Hoenlein (President)
- Status: Active

Location
- Location: 56 King George Street, Jerusalem
- Country: Israel
- Coordinates: 31°46′33″N 35°13′01″E

Architecture
- Architect: Alexander Friedman
- Type: Synagogue architecture
- Style: Modernist
- Funded by: Sir Isaac Wolfson
- Established: 1958 (as a congregation)
- Completed: 1982
- Construction cost: US$18 million
- Capacity: 1,400

Website
- jerusalemgreatsynagogue.com

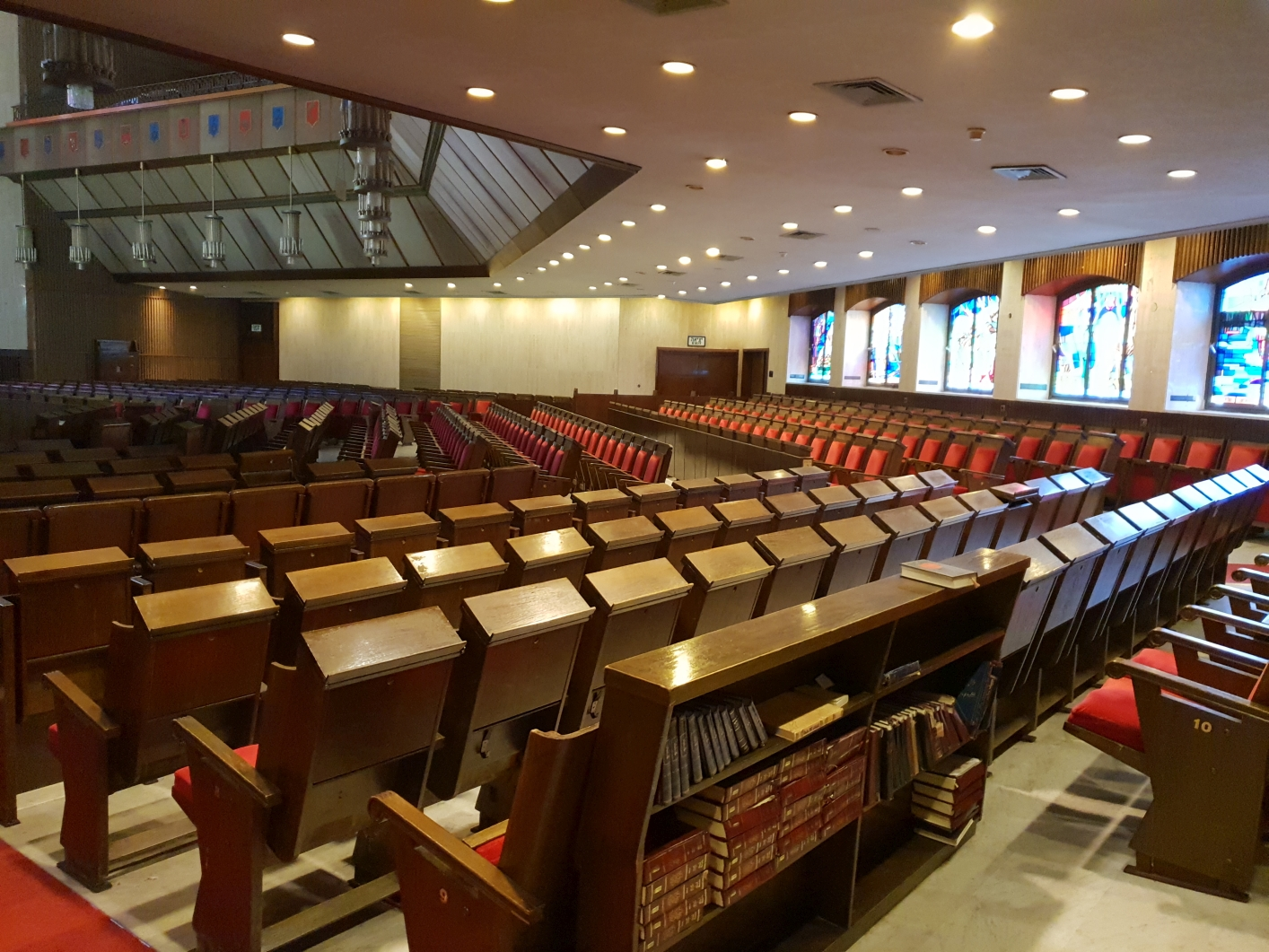
The Jerusalem Great Synagogue

The Jerusalem Great Synagogue (Hebrew: בֵּית הַכְּנֶסֶת הַגָּדוֹל בּיְרוּשָׁלַיִם, romanized: Beit HaKnesset HaGadol b'Yerushalayim) is an Orthodox Jewish congregation and synagogue, located at 56 King George Street, Jerusalem, Israel. Different parts of the congregation worship in the Ashkenazi and Sephardic rites.

== History ==
As early as 1923 the Chief Rabbis of Israel, Abraham Kook and Jacob Meir, mooted plans for a large central synagogue in Jerusalem. It was over 30 years later in 1958 when Heichal Shlomo, seat of the Israeli Rabbinate, was founded, that a small synagogue was established within the building. As time passed and the need for more space grew, services were moved and held in the foyer of Heichal Shlomo. Soon afterwards, when the premises could not hold the number of worshippers attending, it was decided that a new, much larger synagogue be built.

The plot of land next to Heichal Shlomo was purchased with the efforts of Dr Moshe Avrohom Yaffe, chairman of the Board of Management of Heichal Shlomo. The main sponsor for construction of the new synagogue was Sir Isaac Wolfson, a Jewish philanthropist from Britain. The Wolfson family consecrated the synagogue in the memory of the six million Jews who were murdered in the Holocaust and to the fallen soldiers of Israel Defense Forces.

The style of the building was modeled on the Jewish Temple by German-born architect Alexander Friedman.

The inauguration took place on Tu B'Av 1982. Rabbi Zalman Druck was the synagogue's first rabbi and he officiated until his death in 2009. Following that the Chief Rabbis of Israel and of Jerusalem, and Grand Rabbi Y. A. Korff (Zvhil-Mezbuz Rebbe of Boston) officiate. Naftali Hershtik was appointed the chief cantor of the synagogue, a position he held until succeeded by Chief Cantor Chaim Adler on 31 December 2008. Today Cantors Avraham Kirshenbaum and Tzvi Weiss lead the prayers, either alone or together.

The sanctuary seats 850 men and 550 women. A comprehensive private collection of mezuzah cases is on show inside the lobby.

== Gallery ==
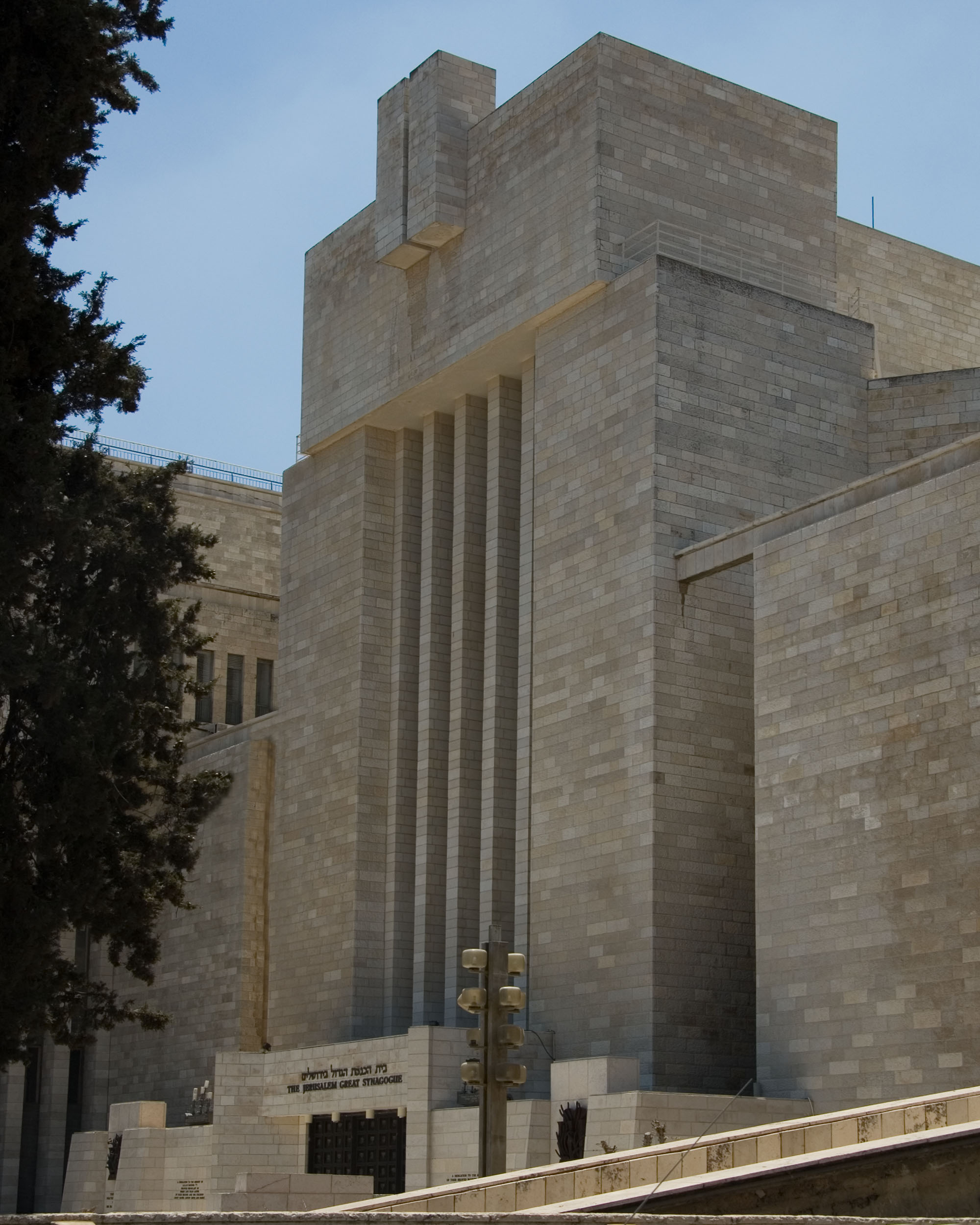
Exterior

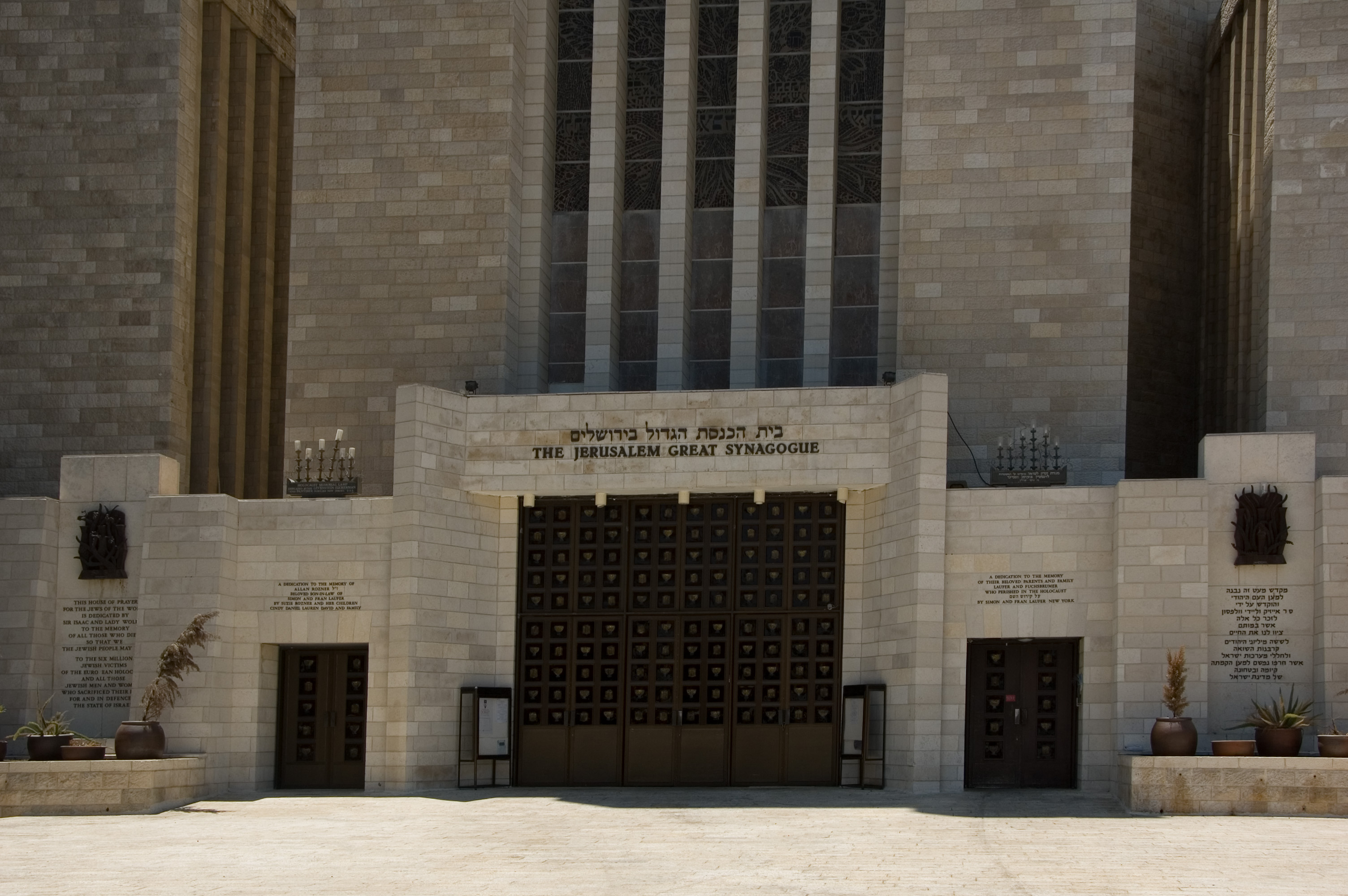
Main entrance

== See also ==
- History of the Jews in Israel
- List of synagogues in Israel
- Synagogues of Jerusalem
- Wolfson family
