= Borgenicht =

Borgenicht is a surname. Notable people with the surname include:

- Grace Borgenicht Brandt (1915–2001), American art dealer
- Jack Borgenicht (1911–2005), American industrialist and land use preservationist
- Nancy Borgenicht (born 1942), American actress
- Ruth Borgenicht (born 1967), American ceramic artist
- Miriam Borgenicht (1915−1992), American mystery novelist
