= David Bohigian =

American businessman

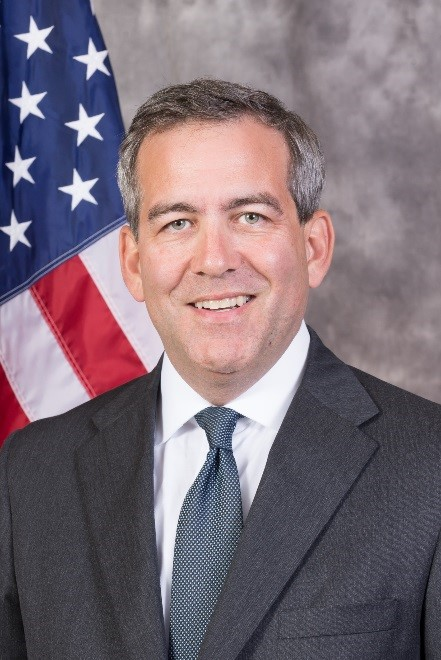
- Official portrait, 2017

President of the Overseas Private Investment Corporation
- Acting; March 1, 2019 – December 20, 2019
- President: Donald Trump
- Preceded by: Ray Washburne
- Succeeded by: Adam S. Boehler (CEO of the International Development Finance Corporation)

Assistant Secretary of Commerce for Market Access and Compliance
- In office December 21, 2005 – January 2009
- President: George W. Bush
- Preceded by: William H. Lash
- Succeeded by: Michael C. Camuñez

Personal details
- Education: Washington and Lee University (BA); Washington University in St. Louis (JD)

Photo of Bohigian swearing in a new member of the OPIC’s Board of Directors, Christopher P. Vincze

David Steele Bohigian is an American businessman, lawyer, investor, venture capitalist, and former government official. He is currently president and CEO of the Meridian International Center, a diplomacy organization based in Washington, D.C.

Bohigian served as Assistant Secretary of Commerce for Market Access and Compliance under President George W. Bush. During the first Donald Trump administration, he was executive vice president (2017-2019) and later acting president of the Overseas Private Investment Corporation, the former development finance institution of the United States government. He was confirmed by voice vote. He was the highest-ranking Armenian American in the first Trump administration at the time.

== Early life and education ==
Bohigian was born on March 7. is of Armenian descent and speaks some Armenian. His grandfather, a survivor of the Armenian genocide, was born in 1910 and was from the vilayet of Darman in Erzerum. His grandfather survived death by hiding in a barn, and immigrated to the United States through Asia. After immigrating, his grandfather worked as a dry cleaner, initially living in Pennsylvania before moving to St. Louis. George Bohigian, the father of David, worked as an ophthalmologist and visited Armenia to help provide eyecare services. In 2012, George Bohigian received the Citizenship and Community Service Award at the Missouri State Medical Association’s 154th Annual Convention.

Bohigian graduated with a bachelor’s degree in journalism from Washington and Lee University in 1992 and a Juris Doctor degree from Washington University School of Law in St. Louis in 1995.

== Career ==
After graduating, Bohigian served as a director and equity partner at venture capital firm Jefferson Partners from October 1995 to June 1999.

In 1999, Bohigian co-founded and served as a managing director at VenCatalyst, a venture capital firm focused on technology companies. In 2000, VenCatalyst was acquired by Internet business incubator Idealab. Bohigian would go on to serve as a managing director at Idealab after the acquisition. As part of Idealab, Bohigian also served in executive roles for their portfolio companies.

After working for the Bush administration’s Commerce Department, Bohigian founded private equity firm E2 Capital Partners in 2009, which focused on energy efficiency projects.

In 2010, Bohigian joined Bridgewater Associates’ core management team. He served as part of Bridgewater’s staff until 2013, when he founded and became managing director of the financial advisory firm and impact investment fund Pluribus Ventures, which has invested in venture capital and private equity funds supporting affordable housing, healthcare research, inclusive fintech, energy efficiency, education, government innovation, and veterans.

Bohigian is also a member of institutions such as the Council on Foreign Relations, the Eagle Scouts of America, and the Missouri Bar Association.

== Government career ==
=== Bush administration ===
Bohigian began his career in government by working for Speaker of the House Newt Gingrich in 1995 as an intern and staff assistant. Regarding his decision to work in government during the Gingrich speakership, he stated "that was an amazing time in US policy".

In 2002, George W. Bush’s administration offered Bohigian a position in the Commerce Department. He held several positions in the Department of Commerce, including Director of Policy and Strategic Planning from 2002 to 2005 and Assistant Secretary of Commerce for Market Access and Compliance from 2005 to 2009.

In September 2008, Bohigian led a clean energy and environment trade mission to China and India as a representative of the Bush administration. Bohigian also served as the Commerce Department’s representative in the Committee on Foreign Investment in the United States (CFIUS).

=== Trum administration ===
In late 2016, Bohigian was appointed to the Donald Trump administration’s Department of Commerce transition team. In February 2017, he served as a special adviser to the United States Department of the Treasury.

In June 2017, President Trump announced his intent to nominate Bohigian as Executive Vice President of the Overseas Private Investment Corporation (OPIC). In August 2017, he was confirmed by the Senate to his position in the OPIC. Bohigian eventually assumed the role of acting president and CEO of the OPIC in March 2019.

Bohigian in Kazakhstan on August 17, 2018

During his time in the OPIC, Bohigian helped implement the Better Utilization of Investments Leading to Development Act (BUILD Act), pitched the Blue Dot Network infrastructure program, approved more than $6 billion in investment worldwide, and helped launch the 2X Africa initiative for women’s empowerment alongside Advisor to the President Ivanka Trump. In the position, he became the highest-ranking Armenian American in the first Trump administration. In office, he traveled to Yerevan to promote U.S. investment projects. He met with Allen Chastanet, prime ministers of Saint Lucia, to discuss matters concerning U.S. relations with Carribean neighbors.

Bohigian helped oversee the OPIC’s conversion into the U.S. International Development Finance Corporation. In late 2019, Bohigian left his position as acting president.

In 2019, President Trump nominated Bohigian as a member of the President’s Commission on White House Fellowships. He later served as a Commissioner of the White House Fellows Foundation.

=== Post-government career ===
In 2026, Bohigian became president and CEO of the Meridian International Center.

== Personal life ==
As of 2018, he often attended an Armenian church with his sister in Belleville, Illinois. He is an avid Backgammon player.
