= Benjamin Black (investor) =

American businessman (born 1984 or 1985)

Ben Black
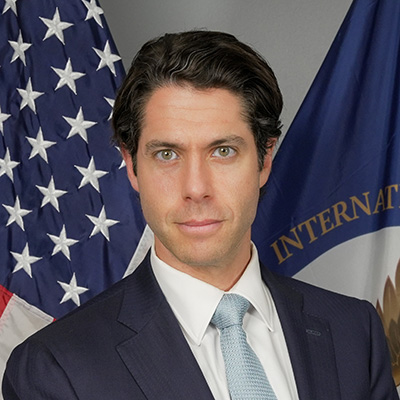

Chief Executive Officer of the U.S. International Development Finance Corporation
- Incumbent
- Assumed office October 7, 2025
- President: Donald Trump
- Preceded by: Scott Nathan

Personal details
- Born: 1984 or 1985 (age 41–42)
- Party: Republican
- Spouse: Charlotte Smith
- Children: 1
- Relatives: Debra Black (mother); Leon Black (father)
- Education: University of Pennsylvania (BA); Harvard University (JD, MBA); New York University (LLM)

Benjamin Black (born 1984/1985) is an American businessman, and chief executive officer of the U.S. International Development Finance Corporation (DFC). He is the founder and managing partner of Fortinbras Enterprises and was the CEO of Osiris Acquisition Corp, with a career spanning roles in private equity, corporate law, and credit investing. Black has held positions at firms including Apollo Global Management, Goldman Sachs, and Sullivan & Cromwell, and has been on the boards of various companies and nonprofit organizations. In 2026, it was reported that records released by the U.S. Department of Justice showed Black had personal and business ties to Jeffrey Epstein.

== Early life ==
Black is the son of Leon Black, a New York billionaire and co-founder of Apollo Global Management, and Debra Black.

He received a BA in history, cum laude, from the University of Pennsylvania. He later earned a JD and MBA from Harvard University and a Masters of Laws in taxation from the NYU School of Law.

== Career ==
=== In private equity ===
Black has worked in credit and equity investing, holding senior roles at financial firms and on several boards.

Earlier in his career, he worked in private equity at Apollo Global Management, co-founded by his father, Leon Black. He also held roles as an analyst at Goldman Sachs in 2007 and as a corporate attorney at Sullivan & Cromwell.

In October 2020, Black founded Fortinbras Enterprises, a New York-based credit investment fund. As of the latest regulatory filing, the firm managed $122 million in assets.

Black was CEO and director of Osiris Acquisition Corp, a special purpose acquisition company (SPAC) formed to raise capital through an initial public offering for the purpose of acquiring another business. He was involved in raising capital for the firm.

Black was senior portfolio manager at Knowledge Universe Holdings, where he oversaw the credit portfolio. He was also a principal and co-founder of OCB Partners.

=== Nomination for Trump administration ===
On June 18, 2025, President Donald Trump nominated Benjamin Black as CEO of the U.S. International Development Finance Corporation, succeeding Scott A. Nathan following his resignation. In announcing the nomination, Trump said Black would apply his financial and deal-making experience to advance U.S. interests abroad.

The nomination drew attention due to his limited background in foreign policy and legislative affairs.

On October 7, 2025, he was confirmed.

==== Substack essay ====
Black co-authored a Substack essay with entrepreneur Joe Lonsdale, a co-founder of Palantir Technologies, in January 2025 titled "How to DOGE US Foreign Aid," which attracted attention during his nomination process. In the essay, he criticized the U.S. Agency for International Development (USAID) for what he described as "mission drift" and questioned funding for initiatives such as gender equity and green energy programs. He advocated for reallocating portions of USAID's budget to the DFC to support pro-market foreign investments that align with U.S. strategic and economic interests.

Black advocated for the DFC to assume greater investment risk, attract private capital, and prioritize strategic sectors, including infrastructure projects such as ports and mines in regions such as Greenland.

==== Confirmation hearing ====
As the nominee to lead the DFC, Black testified before the Senate Foreign Relations Committee about the agency's future under his potential leadership. Black highlighted the DFC's dual mandate to promote economic development and support U.S. foreign policy objectives, stating that he did not view these goals as being in conflict. Senator Tom Cotton, who introduced him at the hearing, described him as an "America First patriot" and stated that Black would bring "a wide range of experience and expertise" to the role.

In his opening statement before the committee, Black stated that, if confirmed, he looked forward to working with Congress to expand the DFC's capabilities and capacity to fulfill its responsibilities.

==== Personal filings ====
According to his ethics filing, Black reported personal assets of at least $219 million, including art, memorabilia, rare books, and investments in various companies. His holdings include a brokerage account, shares in blue chip stocks, and interests in funds managed by Apollo Global Management Inc. He is also the beneficiary of a discretionary trust that distributed $54 million to him over a 14-month period.

== Epstein files ==
In June 2026, The Guardian reported that emails and business filings released by the United States Department of Justice showed personal and business ties between Black and convicted child sex trafficker Jeffrey Epstein. Based on its review of more than 5,000 records from Epstein's correspondence, the newspaper reported that Black and Epstein both invested in a company together in 2011 and maintained a relationship for several years afterward. In the correspondence, Epstein wrote that he had attended Black's 30th birthday party and had advised him on the purchase of an $11.5 million townhouse.

Black's father, Leon Black, was a client of Epstein's. The New York Times and Bloomberg News reported that Leon Black was Epstein's highest-paying client, and that he riled on Epstein for tax advice to arrange payments to girls.

== Boards and philanthropy ==
Black is on the boards of several organizations, including Dogpound, Huddle House, and Phaidon. He is also a board member of Peninsula Real Estate, the Melanoma Research Alliance, and the Naval War College Foundation. In addition, he is a member of the Global Advisory Council of the Woodrow Wilson Center and is on the Advisory Board of Harvard's Center for Public Leadership.

Black and his family established the Black Family Fellowship in honor of his grandfather, Ira Ressler, a decorated World War II veteran. The fellowship supports U.S. veterans and active-duty military personnel attending Harvard Kennedy School, Harvard Business School, and Harvard Law School by providing financial assistance and professional development opportunities.

From 2015 to 2020, he was a term member of the Council on Foreign Relations.

== Personal life ==
He is married to Charlotte Smith, and they have one son. Charlotte's father, Tempel Smith, is the mayor of Old Mill Creek, Illinois. As of December 2025, they were expecting a second child.

== See also ==
- Benedict I. Lubell
- Eli M. Black
- Grace Borgenicht Brandt
- Tony Ressler
