= Elizabeth Littlefield =

American businesswoman and executive

Elizabeth L. Littlefield
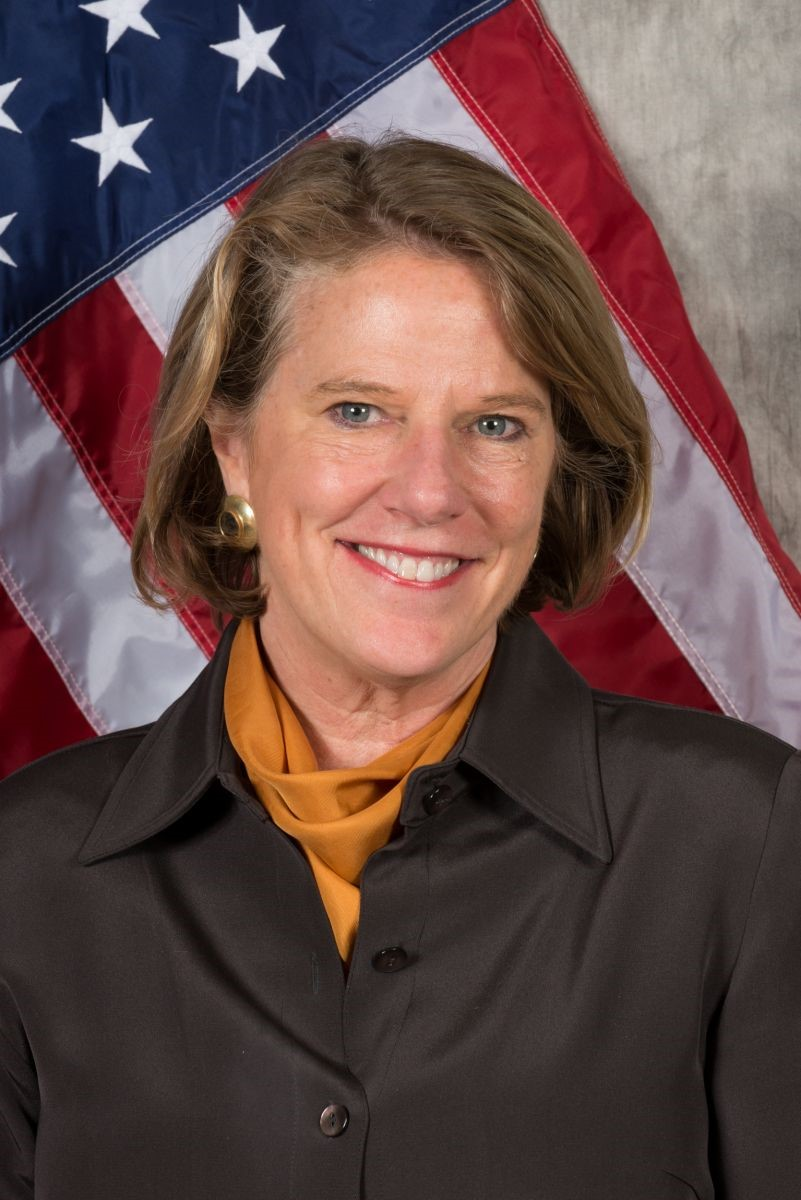

President and CEO of the Overseas Private Investment Corporation
- Incumbent
- Assumed office October 1, 2010 - January 20, 2017
- President: Barack Obama
- Preceded by: Robert Mosbacher, Jr.
- Succeeded by: Ray Washburne

Personal details
- Born: Elizabeth Lascelles Littlefield Boston, Massachusetts, U.S.
- Education: Brown University

Elizabeth L. Littlefield is an American businesswoman and executive. She is the Senior Partner and co-founder of West Africa Blue, and Senior Advisor at Pollination, a climate change investment and advisory firm. She chairs the Board of M-KOPA solar and serves on the board of the World Wildlife Fund (US).

Formerly, Littlefield was a Senior Counselor and Head of Sustainability at Albright Stonebridge Group. She served as the chairman, President, and CEO of the Overseas Private Investment Corporation (OPIC), now a part of the U.S. International Development Finance Corporation (USIDFC), during the Obama administration. Prior, she served as the CEO of the Consultative Group to Assist the Poor (CGAP) and as a Director at the World Bank. She began her career at JPMorgan where she served in positions including as managing director for Emerging Markets.

== Early life ==
A native of Boston, Littlefield attended the Fondation Nationale de Sciences Politiques and Columbia University in Paris, France in 1981, obtaining a Certificat d'Etudes de Sciences Politiques. In 1982, she graduated from Brown University in Providence, Rhode Island cum laude with a B.A. in International Relations. In 1984, she completed JPMorgan's 10 month bank management training program.

== Career ==
In 1982, Littlefield joined the global investment banking and advisory services firm JPMorgan.

In her first three years, based in New York City, she managed relationships of JPMorgan with financial institution in Belgium, Holland, and Luxembourg. During this time, she began collaborating with Women's World Banking.

From 1986 to 1988, Littlefield was JPMorgan's Director of Investment Banking based in Paris. She was responsible for design, creation, marketing, and technical aspects of 24 multi-currency investment funds incorporated in France and Luxembourg.

While working at J.P. Morgan, she obtained a leave of absence from 1988 to 1990 to move to West Africa to help local communities establish several start-up microfinance institutions in Central and West Africa. She helped the founding board create the Gambia Women's Finance Association as well as start-up microfinance institutions in Mali, Senegal, Mauritania, Rwanda, and Burundi.

In April 1990, Littlefield moved to London to establish the Emerging Market Sales and Trading business for JPMorgan, in which capacity she was Head Debt Trader for Africa, Eastern Europe, and Asia. During this time, Littlefield also crafted also discounted debt structures, such as debt-for-nature swaps.

In January 1993, Littlefield became managing director of Emerging Markets Capital Markets at JPMorgan, responsible for bond issues and structured debt financing across Central, Eastern and Southern Europe, nations of the former Soviet Union, the Middle East and Africa.

In 1999, she was recruited to serve in a joint capacity as a Director of the World Bank's Financial and Private Sector Division, and chief executive officer of The Consultative Group to Assist the Poor from 1999 to 2010 a microfinance think tank.

From 2007 to 2008, Littlefield was an adjunct professor leading a graduate course on Financial Sector Reform and Global Development at SAIS, the Paul H. Nitze School of Advanced International Studies of the Johns Hopkins University.

She is chair of the board of M-KOPA, (Kenya), Senior Adviser at Pollination (UK, USA, Australia), and Solon Capital Partners, (Sierra Leone), Board of Adviser at General Atlantic's Beyond Net Zero fund (UK), Development Alternatives Inc. (USA), and Nicholas Institute for Environmental Policy (USA), board member and Treasurer World Wildlife Fund (US).

== Government career ==
From 2010 to 2017, Littlefield served as the chairman, President and CEO of the Overseas Private Investment Corporation (OPIC), the U.S. Government's development finance agency during the Obama administration. In this role, an Under Secretary-level position, she managed OPIC's $29 billion portfolio of financing and insurance to support private investment in developing countries. Under Littlefield's leadership, OPIC investments in renewable energy grew ten-fold its investment portfolio doubled and it ranked at the top of the federal government's employee viewpoint rankings.

Littlefield also instituted complete transformations and reforms of the agency's policies, systems and processes and introduced new financial innovations and partnerships to augment the agency's development impact. In redirecting the agency's sector focus toward renewable resources, especially natural resources, solar and wind energy, as well as impact investing.

During her tenure at OPIC, Littlefield increased investments in Sub-Saharan Africa by 250 percent from 2009 to 2015. The agency was the principal source of financing under President Obama's signature Power Africa initiative.

Littlefield was appointed by President Obama to serve as a member of the White House Global Development Council and the President’s Export Council. She was presented in 2012 with the U.S. State Department's Distinguished Service Award, the highest award in the Foreign Service, by then U.S. Secretary of State Hillary Clinton.

In November 2020, Littlefield co-led of the Joe Biden presidential transition Agency Review Team to support transition efforts related to international development.
