= Ray Washburne =

American businessman (born 1960)

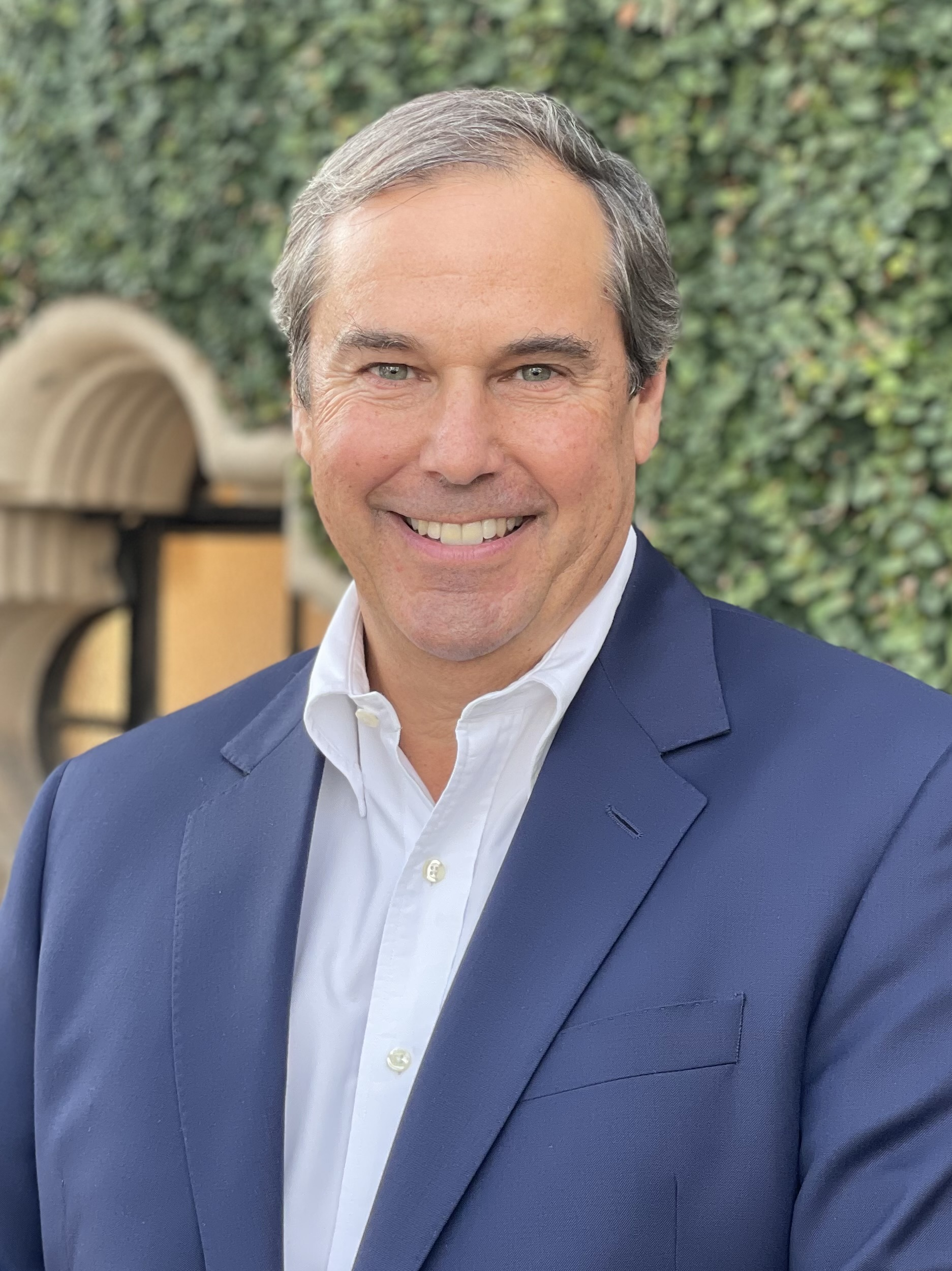
- Washburne in 2021

President and CEO of the Overseas Private Investment Corporation
- In office September 5, 2017 – March 1, 2019
- President: Donald Trump
- Preceded by: Elizabeth Littlefield
- Succeeded by: David Bohigian (acting)

Personal details
- Born: Ray Willets Washburne; 1960 (age 65–66) Dallas, Texas, U.S.
- Party: Republican
- Education: Southern Methodist University (BA)

Ray Willets Washburne is an American businessman, political fundraiser, and government official. He co-founded the M Crowd Restaurant Group, which owns Mi Cocina and other restaurants. He served as president and CEO of the Overseas Private Investment Corporation from 2017 to 2019 and as a member of the President's Intelligence Advisory Board from 2019 to 2020.

Previously, he has served as an adjunct professor at Cox School of Business.

== Career ==
=== Business ===
Washburne is a co-founder of the M Crowd Restaurant Group, owning forty-six restaurants, including the Mi Cocina and Taco Diner restaurant chains. He also has real-estate developments in several states and is the CEO of Charter Holdings. In 2009, Washburne and his family bought the Highland Park Village, an upscale shopping center in Dallas, for $170 million (~$241 million in 2024).

In December 2020, Washburn'e HP Village Management was contracted by the owners of Knox Street District in Dallas to assist with the leasing, marketing, and management of their property.

In April 2022, Washburne's HP Village Management acquired a stake in the shopping center Phillips Place, located in Charlotte, North Carolina. In the same month, Washburne's Charter Holdings acquired Watters Creek shopping center in Allen, Texas.

In July 2019, Washburne’s Charter DMN Holdings purchased an 8-acre campus that was home to the iconic Dallas Morning News "Rock of Truth" building for $28 million and announced development plans that included a boutique business hotel and entertainment amenities that would complement the city's new convention center that was under construction. In February 2025, he announced that the bulk of the property had been sold to an undisclosed entity that was planning to build a data center on the site, which he said was caused in part by the city's lack of communication about its development plans. Two months later in April 2025, he sold the property to the city of Dallas for $51.5 million.

In June 2024, Washburne's HP Village Management acquired Country Club Plaza in Kansas City from Macerich and Taubman Centers. The acquisition followed a discussion at an Urban Land Institute conference in May 2024, where Nuveen, a lender associated with Highland Park Village, approached Washburne about a new project. Washburne, who had previously invested over $100 million in Highland Park Village, would make a substantial investment in the Missouri complex with Nuveen remaining involved. The redevelopment plan for Country Club Plaza includes its division into several districts, each dedicated to contemporary fashion, food and beverage, and luxury and designer goods.

Washburne is currently the chairman of the board of Sunoco, LP. He is also a member of Council on Foreign Relations and a board member of SMU Cox School of Business Executive Committee.

=== Government ===
On June 5, 2017, President Trump nominated Washburne as president of the Overseas Private Investment Corporation. The U.S. Senate confirmed him by voice vote on August 3, 2017. He worked to increase the OPIC's funding and activities despite the Trump administration's previous plans to shut down the agency. In 2018, Washburn led the effort to create the International Development Finance Corporation (DFC) which replaced OPIC with a merger of entities from USAID, State Department, and OPIC.

In February 2019, Washburne announced he would resign as OPIC's head on March 1.

In 2019, Washburne was appointed to the President's Intelligence Advisory Board.

In 2019, Washburne was appointed to the advisory board of the US Military Southern Command.

=== Political fundraising ===
Washburne was actively involved in raising money for George W. Bush's presidential campaigns in both 2000 and 2004, and in the following years continued to raise money for the Republican Party. In 2011, he became finance chairman of Governor Tim Pawlenty bid for president. Later, in the 2012 presidential election, he backed Mitt Romney, the Republican Party's nominee, and became the campaign's Texas co-chair, while also raising money. Following the 2012 election, in which Romney was defeated, Washburne became the finance chairman of the Republican National Committee, during which he raised $160 million (~$215 million in 2024) for the party.

In 2015, he became a part of Chris Christie's 2016 campaign for president, serving as the finance chairman. Christie subsequently conceded in the race, and after Donald Trump emerged as the Republican front-runner, Washburne raised money for Trump's campaign and became the vice chairman of the Trump Victory Committee, which acted as a bridge between the campaign and the RNC. After Trump's victory, he was the head on the Trump transition team for the Commerce Department.

In 2020, Washburne played a role in convincing Trump to call for restoring a tax break allowing corporations to fully deduct restaurant meal and entertainment costs.

== Personal life ==
Washburne was born in Dallas, Texas in 1960, and was raised in Highland Park, later graduating from Southern Methodist University. In 1997 he married Heather Hill, a descendant of H. L. Hunt.

In 2021, Washburne committed $5,000,000 to SMU to construct the new Washburne Soccer and Track Stadium. The facility has been recognized as one of the finest facilities for college soccer and completed the urban design of the campus.

== Awards and recognition ==
- Commercial Real Estate Hall of Fame (2023)
- North Texas Commercial Association of Realtors Hall of Fame (2023)
- Distinguished Alumni of the Southern Methodist University Award (2023)
