= Leon Black =

American private equity investor (born 1951)

- Born: Leon David Black; July 31, 1951 (age 75)
- Education: Dartmouth College (BA); Harvard University (MBA)
- Known for: Co-founder of Apollo Management
- Spouse: Debra Ressler
- Children: 4, including Benjamin
- Father: Eli M. Black
- Family: Tony Ressler (brother-in-law); Benedict I. Lubell (uncle); Grace Borgenicht Brandt (aunt)

Leon David Black (born July 31, 1951) is an American private equity investor. He is the former CEO of Apollo Global Management, which he co-founded in 1990 with Marc Rowan and Josh Harris. Black was the chairman of the Museum of Modern Art from 2018 to 2021. Black resigned from both Apollo Global Management and the Museum of Modern Art in the wake of revelations about his business ties to the New York financier and child sex offender, Jeffrey Epstein.

Between 2012 and 2017, Black paid Epstein a total of $170 million for "tax and financial services" that reportedly saved him over $1 billion in taxes. After Black had a long-term affair with a Russian model, she threatened to make public allegations of sexual abuse unless he paid her $100 million. Epstein negotiated a 2015 NDA under which Black agreed to pay her $100,000 per month over 15 years, totalling $18 million. In 2020, Black said that he "deeply regrets" his relationship with Epstein.

As of 2026, Black has a net worth of approximately $13.8 billion according to the Bloomberg Billionaires Index, derived primarily from his retained stake in Apollo Global Management.

== Early life and education ==
Black is a son of Eli M. Black (1921–1975), a Jewish businessman who emigrated from Poland as a child (surname, "Blachowitz") and was the chairman and later majority owner of the United Brands Company. His mother, Shirley Lubell (sister of Tulsa oil executive Benedict I. Lubell) was an artist. In 1975, his father killed himself at age 53.

Black received an AB in philosophy and history from Dartmouth College in 1973 and an MBA from Harvard Business School in 1975.

== Career ==
Black started out as an accountant at Peat Marwick (which later became KPMG) and with the publisher Boardroom Reports. He also interviewed at Lehman Brothers but was told he did not have the brains or personality to succeed on Wall Street. From 1977 to 1990, Black was employed by investment bank Drexel Burnham Lambert, where he rose to managing director and head of the Mergers and Acquisitions Group, and co-head of the Corporate Finance Department. At Drexel, Black was regarded as "junk bond king" Michael Milken's right-hand man.

After Drexel Burnham Lambert filed for bankruptcy in 1990, Black co-founded Apollo Global Management with Marc Rowan, Josh Harris, and Antony Ressler. Apollo specialized in leveraged buyouts and distressed securities, growing to become one of the world's largest private equity firms. The firm went public in 2011 and as of March 2026 manages approximately $1.03 trillion in assets under management. Black was CEO until January 2021, when he stepped down following the publication of the Dechert report into his financial ties to Jeffrey Epstein, and fully departed Apollo in March 2021. Since leaving Apollo, Black has managed his personal investments through his family office Elysium Management, which invests in real estate and private equity.

In 2012, Black acquired Phaidon Press, a fine art books publishing house.

Black's net worth results primarily from his retained stake in Apollo Global Management. In February 2024, he sold Apollo shares for the first time since co-founding the firm, offloading approximately $172.8 million worth of stock (roughly 2% of his holding). Documents released through the Justice Department's Epstein investigation included a detailed 2014-2015 financial summary of Black's personal balance sheet, offering an unusually in-depth view of his assets, debts, and liquidity at a time when his net worth was estimated at approximately $5 billion.

=== Board roles ===
Black was on the Board of Trustees of Dartmouth College from 2002 to 2011. He is on Dartmouth's President's Leadership Council and has endowed a chair in Shakespeare Studies as well as a program in Jewish Studies.

In 2018, he was elected chairman of The Museum of Modern Art (MoMA) in New York City. His term commenced on July 1, 2018. His term as chairman ended on July 1, 2021, and he did not seek re-election, in the wake of protests from dozens of artists and activists over his financial ties to convicted sex offender Jeffrey Epstein.

Leon and his wife Debra are both on the board of the Melanoma Research Alliance.

== Personal life ==
Black is married to Debra Ressler, a 1976 Barnard College graduate and Broadway producer and sister of Apollo Management co-founder Antony Ressler. They have four children. One of their children, Benjamin, runs an investment fund and was nominated by President Donald Trump to run the U.S. International Development Finance Corporation. Debra Black is a melanoma survivor. In 2007, the couple donated $25 million to form the Melanoma Research Alliance.

In 2012, Black gave $48 million toward a new visual arts center at Dartmouth College.

In 2016, Black listed his condominium at Miami's Faena House for sale with listing agent Oren Alexander. Black's primary home is in Manhattan and he has a beachfront compound in Southampton, New York. In 2016, he and Debra bought a Beverly Hills estate previously owned by the actor Tom Cruise for approximately $38 million; the property sold in March 2026 for approximately $47 million.

=== Art collection ===
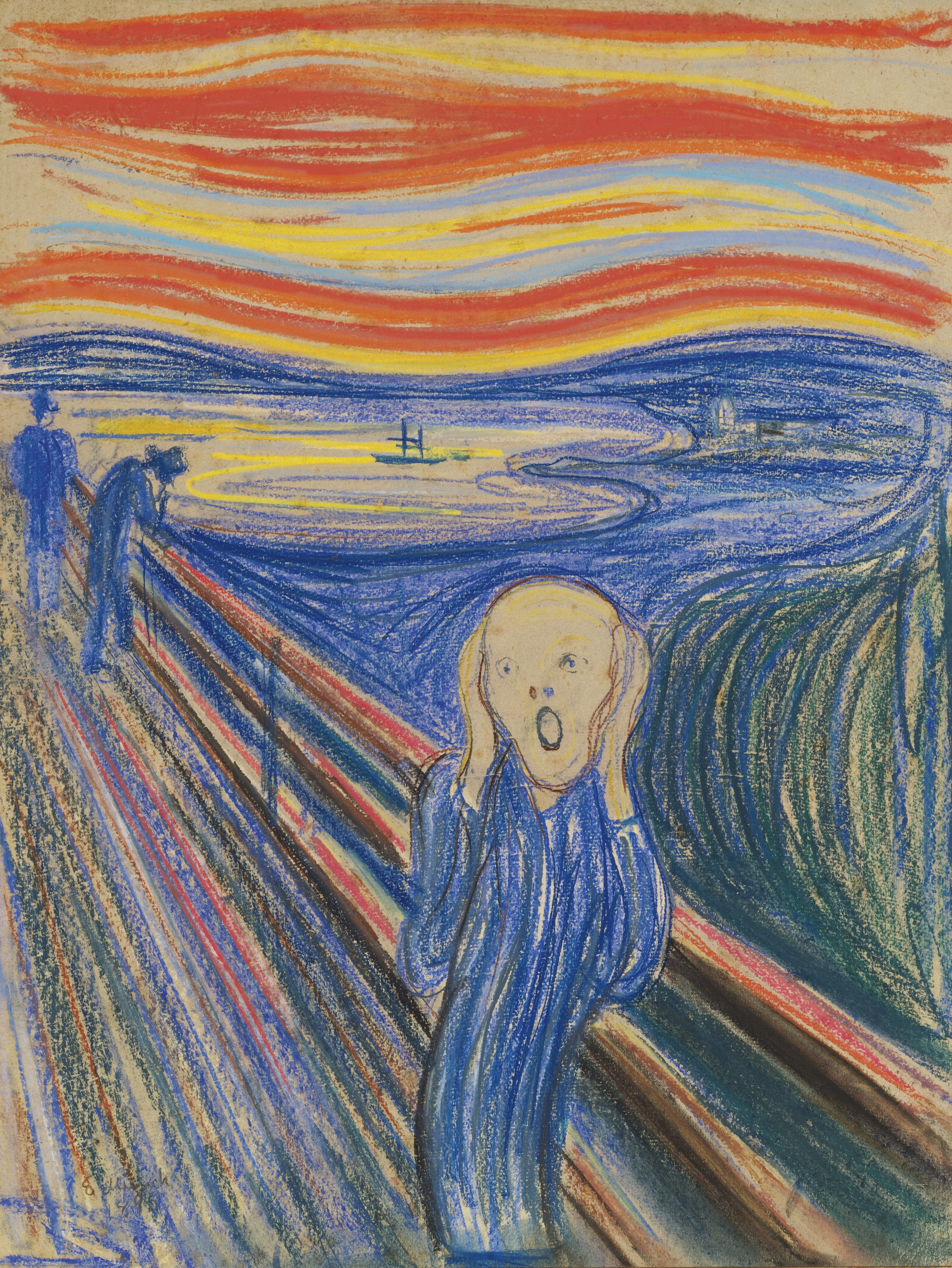
The Scream by Edvard Munch

In May 2012, Black purchased one of the four versions of Edvard Munch's The Scream. He paid $119.9 million for the pastel, then the highest price ever paid for a work of art. In September 2012, the Museum of Modern Art announced the work would be exhibited for a six-month period starting in October.

In June 2013, it was revealed that Black had purchased Head of a Young Apostle, an 11-inch-wide (28 cm) work by Raphael for £29 million after a four-party bidding war.

On December 22, 2015, it was reported that Black purchased at auction a complete set of the Daniel Bomberg Babylonian Talmud for $9.3 million. According to a press release from the Sotheby's auction house, the sale was "a new world auction record for any piece of Judaica."

In June 2016, a lawsuit over the Picasso sculpture Bust of a Woman (Marie-Thérèse) between the advisory firm Pelham Europe and art gallery owner Larry Gagosian was settled. Pelham Europe, an agent for a member of Qatar's royal family, and Gagosian, who had resold the bust to Black, both claimed ownership. The case was settled by Maya Widmaier-Picasso, the owner of the sculpture. The settlement included Black getting the sculpture and Widmaier Picasso paying Pelham an undisclosed amount.

== Relationship with Jeffrey Epstein ==
Black had a friendship with sex offender Jeffrey Epstein. For Epstein's birthday book that was compiled in 2003 by Epstein's associate Ghislaine Maxwell, Black contributed a "handwritten poem with a rhyme scheme" which included the acronym "V.F.P.C." which stood for "Vanity Fair Poster Child". This was in reference to a profile of Epstein that was being written for the magazine. The poem contained the lines "Blonde, Red or Brunette, spread out geographically/With this net of fish, Jeff’s now The Old Man and The Sea". He signed the poem "Love and kisses, Leon".

In 2009, Black contributed $60 million in a settlement with Huntsman Corporation after Apollo was sued for backing out of a merger the previous year. In 2021, Black stepped down as CEO and chairman after Dechert LLP, which had been retained several months earlier by Apollo to investigate Black's dealings with Epstein, published a report finding that Black had paid $158 million to Epstein between 2012 and 2017 for advice on taxes and estate planning. In 2022, Black included Josh Harris in a civil Racketeer Influenced and Corrupt Organizations (RICO) lawsuit, alleging that he led a group within Apollo attempting to tarnish his reputation after his ties to Epstein were reported. Federal judge Paul Engelmayer dismissed the suit for lack of evidence, with an appeals court upholding the decision in 2023.

In 2019, Black stated that he maintained a "limited relationship" with Epstein. However, Epstein's calendar showed that between 2013 and 2017 he had more than 100 meetings with Black, typically held at Epstein's townhouse.

In 1997, Black appointed Epstein as one of the trustees of his Foundation. In his 2020 letter to Apollo investors, Black said that Epstein provided him with "estate planning, tax and philanthropic advice" to his "family partnership and other related family entities". The New York Times reported that Black had paid Epstein at least $50 million for such services from 2012 to 2017. Black did not at the time confirm the $50 million sum reported by The New York Times, but said that he paid Epstein "millions of dollars annually for his work". In October 2020, Black requested that the Apollo board conduct an independent review of his relationship with Epstein, and it retained the law firm Dechert LLP to do so. Black has said that he "deeply regrets" his relationship with Epstein.

The review conducted by Dechert LLP was released on January 25, 2021. It showed that Black had paid Epstein around $158 million from 2012 through 2017 for financial services. Using Epstein's tax avoidance strategies, Black saved at least $1.3 billion in taxes. Black pledged his intention to donate $200 million to women's initiatives. In 2023, Black paid $62.5 million to the U.S. Virgin Islands to be released from claims related to Epstein. In July 2023, the U.S. Senate Finance Committee made public that it was investigating Black's tax strategies and dealings with Epstein.

In July 2025, Senator Ron Wyden, who sits on the Senate Finance Committee, called on the Internal Revenue Service to investigate potential tax evasion related to Black's payments to Epstein, urging the Justice Department to subpoena Epstein-related records from Bank of America, JPMorgan Chase, and Deutsche Bank. In March 2026, Wyden released new information establishing that Black had paid Epstein a total of $170 million (not $158 million as previously reported) after Senate investigators discovered an additional $12 million in transfers that had been missed by the earlier Apollo-commissioned Dechert review.

According to a 2026 report by the New York Times, Black had paid Epstein a total of $170 million by 2017 for what Black said were tax and estate work. According to the Times, the sum far exceeded what "elite" law or accounting firms charge for such work. The Times reported that Epstein did not just provide tax and estate work, but helped Black dispense money to women, with at least $20 million going to a dozen women, with some of whom Black had sexual relations.

In June 2026, Black appeared voluntarily for a closed-door transcribed interview before the United States House Committee on Oversight and Government Reform as part of its investigation into Jeffrey Epstein and Ghislaine Maxwell. Black told the committee that Epstein had "duped and deceived" him and denied knowing about Epstein's sex-trafficking activities. He declined to answer broader questions concerning non-disclosure agreements involving women, and the interview ended before the committee had completed its questioning. Committee chairman James Comer subsequently issued two subpoenas, one requiring Black to produce the agreements and another compelling him to return for a deposition. The committee released the transcript of the interview on July 17. Comer has threatened to hold Black in contempt of Congress if the latter does not produce more NDAs.

In July 2026, a committee spokesperson said that Black's attorney had confirmed he would appear for the subpoenaed deposition on September 3, 2026, and would produce the agreements; Comer had said the deposition would be videotaped and taken under oath. Black did not attend the deposition and did not produce the agreements, suing the committee instead. However, on September 3, 2026, Black filed a lawsuit against the House Oversight Committee, stating that the committee was overstepping its authority, and that he would not appear before them or turn over nondisclosure agreements between himself and women.

On August 31, 2026, Representative Thomas Massie named Black, in a speech on the floor of the House of Representatives, as one of fourteen people he said had aided Epstein in his crimes, and pressed the Justice Department to release more than three million files it had withheld. Massie said that "perhaps hearing these names will shame the Department of Justice into delivering justice", and described those he named as co-conspirators. PBS News Hour noted that inclusion in the released Epstein files does not in itself indicate wrongdoing.

In September 2026, the financial journalist William D. Cohan published Money to Burn: The Unvarnished Truth About Leon Black, Apollo, and the Rise of a New Wall Street, a biography drawing on interviews with Black that were first published in Puck. Cohan's account attributes Black's downfall to his own conduct and credulity rather than to complicity in Epstein's crimes, and Cohan described the book as in part a rebuttal of the press coverage of Black. A spokesman for The New York Times said the paper had "covered Leon Black fairly and accurately, and the reporting has stood up through all the Epstein revelations that followed". Cohan noted that the congressional scrutiny of Black's payments to women emerged late in the book's production.

=== Federal Epstein lawsuit versus U.S. Congress ===
On September 3, 2026, Black did not attend a deposition the House Oversight Committee had subpoenaed him to give, and instead sued the committee in federal court in Washington, seeking to "block subpoenas issued as part of its investigation into disgraced financier Jeffrey Epstein". The suit argued that two subpoenas served in June were "invalid" and that the committee had exceeded its authority in seeking nondisclosure agreements Black might have entered into with women, saying those women had "bargained for confidentiality" and had been given "no notice" and "no way to be heard". According to The New York Times, it was the first time a witness called in the committee's Epstein investigation had gone to federal court to challenge its authority.

Bipartisan members of the committee said they would review holding Black in Contempt of Congress. Comer said, "I would hold him in contempt right now", but added that he would consult committee members and House lawyers because "I don't want to do anything to harm our chances in court". Robert Garcia, the panel's senior Democrat, called the lawsuit "laughable" and said Black was seeking to slow the investigation. Estrich said the committee was on a "fishing expedition" and was "looking for information that does not exist". Comer said it was "a shame Leon Black is hiding behind litigation rather than provide answers to the American people", described the lawsuit as "totally unexpected" and said the committee needed the agreements; Estrich replied that they were not relevant to the committee's work and that "to imply misconduct because of the existence of a confidentiality agreement is entirely unjustified". Through Estrich, Black again denied wrongdoing, saying that he "never abused a woman", "never engaged in sex trafficking" and "never paid Epstein for access to women", and that he "regrets ever dealing with Epstein".

=== Contempt of Congress ===
On September 16, 2026, the U.S. House of Representatives unanimously voted to charge Black with Contempt of Congress.

=== Defamation lawsuit ===
In November 2026, Black filed a federal defamation lawsuit against Robert Garcia for public comments about Black's relationship with Epstein.

== Lawsuits alleging sexual misconduct ==
In March 2021, Russian model Guzel Ganieva claimed in a series of tweets, that beginning in 2008 she was "sexually harassed and abused by [Black] for years [and ultimately] forced to sign a non-disclosure agreement under duress". Black denied the allegations, stating that he had engaged in a years long consensual affair with her. Black accused her of extortion after paying her millions of dollars through an NDA to keep quiet about their affair. Ganieva filed a lawsuit (represented by Jeanne Christensen of Wigdor LLP), and Black countersued her. Ganieva also alleged that Black introduced her to Epstein, and that he attempted to force her to have sex with him. A judge dismissed Ganieva's lawsuit in May 2023 after ruling that the "NDA clearly and unambiguously covers all claims arising out of the parties’ relationship, past or future". Black described the lawsuit as "exceptionally painful". In January 2025, the Appellate Division in Manhattan ruled for Black in a 4–1 decision, upholding the ruling. In 2026, unsealed emails showed that, in 2015, Ganieva had demanded $100 million from Black. At the time, Jeffrey Epstein assisted Black in handling the conflict and arranged meetings between the two. Ganieva eventually agreed to a non-disclosure agreement, under which Black paid her $100,000 per month, over 15 years, totalling $18 million.

In 2022, Jeanne Christensen filed another lawsuit on behalf of her client Cheri Pierson; who accused Black of raping her in 2002 in Jeffrey Epstein's New York City mansion. Black denied ever having met Pierson, and his attorney describing the lawsuit as an extortion attempt. Pierson dropped her lawsuit in February 2024. Black's lawyers described Pierson as a "serial litigator who has been involved in over 35 previous lawsuits, has an extensive criminal record, and has been publicly accused of harassment, stalking, and threatening to kill others".

On July 25, 2023, a third lawsuit was brought by an anonymous plaintiff (also represented by Jeanne Christensen), alleging that Black violently raped her when she was a 16-year-old girl with autism and Down syndrome, with the "developmental age" of a 12 year old, inside Epstein's Manhattan townhouse in 2002. Black denied the allegations or ever meeting the plaintiff, accusing Wigdor of repeatedly manufacturing "defamatory lies, masquerading as allegations". Family members of the plaintiff later gave interviews with Black's investigators, and alleged that she has a history of inventing stories, and was never diagnosed with Down syndrome or autism, but began mimicking symptoms as an adult. Her family said she was never trafficked to Epstein or Black, because she was attending school at the time. The plaintiff later claimed that she served as a "human incubator" for Epstein, bearing children, which were taken by Ghislaine Maxwell soon after birth. Her journals purported to support these claims were released in the Epstein files. In April 2026, a judge determined that the plaintiff had "falsified sonogram images in her personal journals". Her lawyer Jeanne Christensen was also sanctioned for repeatedly lying to the court, and exited the case. Doe is now representing herself. Black's lawyers have urged authorities to investigate Doe for fraud on the court.

In August 2023, Black sued Wigdor LLP for malicious prosecution, arguing the Wigdor business model relied upon "scandalous allegations that can be avoided only at the cost of a large settlement, of which Wigdor takes a substantial cut". In September 2024, a judge denied Wigdor's request to have it dismissed, however, in March 2025, an appeals court dismissed the suit, citing anti-SLAPP laws intended to protect litigation freedoms.

In March 2026, Wigdor LLP filed a fourth lawsuit against Black, alleging that he used strategic lawsuits against public participation against their attorneys and their clients.

In April 2026, a judge sanctioned Wigdor LLP lawyer Jeanne Christensen in a 76 page ruling, determining that she had repeatedly lied to the court and Black's lawyers. Black's lawyers said Wigdor "destroyed evidence, falsified evidence and committed ‘serious and varied misconduct’ in their zeal to try to destroy Mr. Black". Wigdor were ordered to pay some of Black's legal fees. The Manhattan district attorney's office briefly investigated sexual assault allegations against Black; no charges were filed.

== Philanthropy ==
Black was a trustee of the Jewish Museum, the Asia Society, Lincoln Center for the Performing Arts, Mount Sinai Hospital, the Cardozo School of Law, and the Vail Valley Foundation.

Through the Debra and Leon Black Family Foundation, he provided $7.5 million to establish a fellowship program for U.S. military personnel and veterans at Harvard Kennedy School.

During the COVID-19 pandemic, Leon and Debra Black partnered with Aramark and the Mayor's Fund to launch NYC Healthcare Heroes. They committed $20 million to provide hundreds of thousands of care packages, including food, household goods, and personal care items, to over 100,000 healthcare workers in New York City.

As of September 2026, Black remains a Trustee of the Museum of Modern Art, although he stepped down as an officer.
