= Adam Boehler =

American businessman and government official (born 1979)

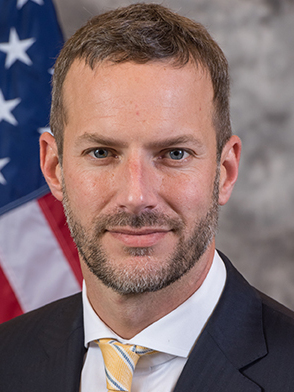

United States Special Envoy for Hostage Response
- Incumbent
- Assumed office April 4, 2025
- President: Donald Trump

CEO of U.S. International Development Finance Corporation
- In office October 1, 2019 – January 20, 2021
- President: Donald Trump
- Preceded by: David Bohigian (acting president of the Overseas Private Investment Corporation)
- Succeeded by: Scott Nathan

Director for the Center for Medicare and Medicaid Innovation
- In office April 2018 – October 2019
- President: Donald Trump
- Preceded by: Patrick Conway
- Succeeded by: Brad Smith

Personal details
- Born: Adam Seth Boehler; June 23, 1979 (age 47) Albany, New York, U.S.
- Party: Republican
- Spouse: Shira Boehler
- Children: 4
- Education: University of Pennsylvania (BS)

Adam Seth Boehler (/ˈboʊlər/ born June 23, 1979) is an American businessman and government official.

Boehler is the managing partner and founder of Rubicon Founders, a health care investment firm based in Nashville. He is also the founder of Landmark Health.

He previously served as the first chief executive officer of the U.S. International Development Finance Corporation from 2019 to 2021, the director of the Center for Medicare and Medicaid Innovation, as well as Senior Advisor for Value-based Transformation for Health and Human Services Secretary Alex Azar and Deputy Administrator of the Centers for Medicare and Medicaid Services. He joined CMS in April 2018.

On April 4, 2025, President Trump appointed him as special envoy for hostage response to oversee cases of U.S. nationals detained abroad under concerning circumstances, including those with health or humanitarian issues, unjustly detained foreign nationals supported by the U.S., and detentions posing national security concerns. Boehler was assigned to coordinate with government agencies, report to Trump and Secretary of State Marco Rubio, and serve as a special government employee until September 2025, unless extended. As of March 2026, he is still in the role. In October 2026, Trump nominated John Coale to succeed him.

== Early life and education ==
Boehler was born in Albany, New York, on June 23, 1979 to a Jewish family. Boehler's father is a physician. Boehler graduated magna cum laude from the Wharton School of the University of Pennsylvania in 2000. He was a summer college roommate of Jared Kushner, with whom he would later work on a team coordinating tests for COVID-19. During college, Boehler worked for a summer at the Financial and Fiscal Commission, a government agency managed by the Parliament of South Africa.

== Early career ==
Boehler started his career at Battery Ventures, a technology venture capital firm that focuses on investments in software and emerging technologies. Boehler was also an operating partner at Francisco Partners, a global private equity firm based in San Francisco focusing on healthcare. Boehler founded and was Chairman of Avalon Health Solutions, a provider of laboratory benefit management services.

Previously, Boehler was the founder and chief executive officer of Accumen, a provider of laboratory management services to health systems. Prior to joining CMS, Boehler was founder and chief executive officer of Landmark Health, the largest provider of home-based medical care in the country. United Health Group purchased Landmark for $3.5 billion in 2021.

== First Trump administration (2018–2021) ==
=== Center for Medicare and Medicaid Innovation ===
Boehler was appointed Director of the Center for Medicare and Medicaid Innovation at the United States Department of Health and Human Services (HHS) in April 2018. While at HHS, Boehler also served as Senior Advisor for Value-based Transformation to Secretary Alex Azar.

While at CMMI, Boehler launched 16 payment models aimed at advancing the transition of the U.S. healthcare system from fee-for-service to value-based payment. These included initiatives to support primary care physicians and to improve kidney care nationwide.

During the COVID crisis, Boehler led teams focused on expanding testing, sourcing critical PPE, and ensuring that there were sufficient ventilators for the United States population (and ultimately helping emerging countries in need). Boehler was a founding board member of Operation Warp Speed. On May 14, 2020, the president of the United States signed an executive order delegating Defense Production Act authorities to Boehler, underwriting the production of various vaccines under consideration in advance of the Food and Drug Administration's approval to expand domestic vaccine supply.

=== International Development Finance Corporation ===
In July 2019, President Donald Trump nominated Boehler for the position of chief executive officer of the newly formed U.S. International Development Finance Corporation, and was confirmed by the Senate.

Under his tenure at the DFC, Boehler helped draft an executive order in response to COVID-19 that expanded the DFC to domestic projects—a break from its congressional mandate, which focused on funding projects in the developing world.

Under Boehler, the DFC and EXIM signed letters of interest with Serbia and Kosovo to help finance projects identified under a U.S. brokered agreement to advance economic cooperation and development between Kosovo and Serbia. Serbian president Aleksandar Vucic and Kosovo prime minister Avdullah Hoti signed the agreement on September 4, 2020, in Washington.

Boehler accompanied Ambassador Zalmay Khalilzad to negotiate with the Taliban in a series of meetings held in Qatar touting the possibility of joint investment in Afghanistan through the Qatar Fund for Development, and promoting a commitment to peace to prioritize Afghanistan's economic growth.

Boehler met with heads of state in Vietnam and Indonesia to discuss investments in energy and infrastructure. He led the last US delegation to meet with State Counselor Aung San Suu Kyi prior to her arrest and imprisonment by the Myanmar military on February 1, 2021.

Boehler met with leaders of countries across the region, including the Caribbean, Colombia, Ecuador, El Salvador, Guatemala, Honduras, and Venezuelan opposition leader Juan Guaidó.

Colombian president Iván Duque and Boehler drafted an economic plan addressing the growth of cocaine farming in Colombia.

Boehler led negotiations with Ecuadorean president Lenín Moreno resulting in a $3.5 billion lending agreement enabling prepayment of loans to China, in exchange for Ecuador excluding Chinese telecoms services and equipment providers from its 5G telecommunications networks.

Boehler met in November 2019 with Ethiopia's prime minister, president, and finance ministers to discuss support of reform initiatives on the nation's developmental goals.

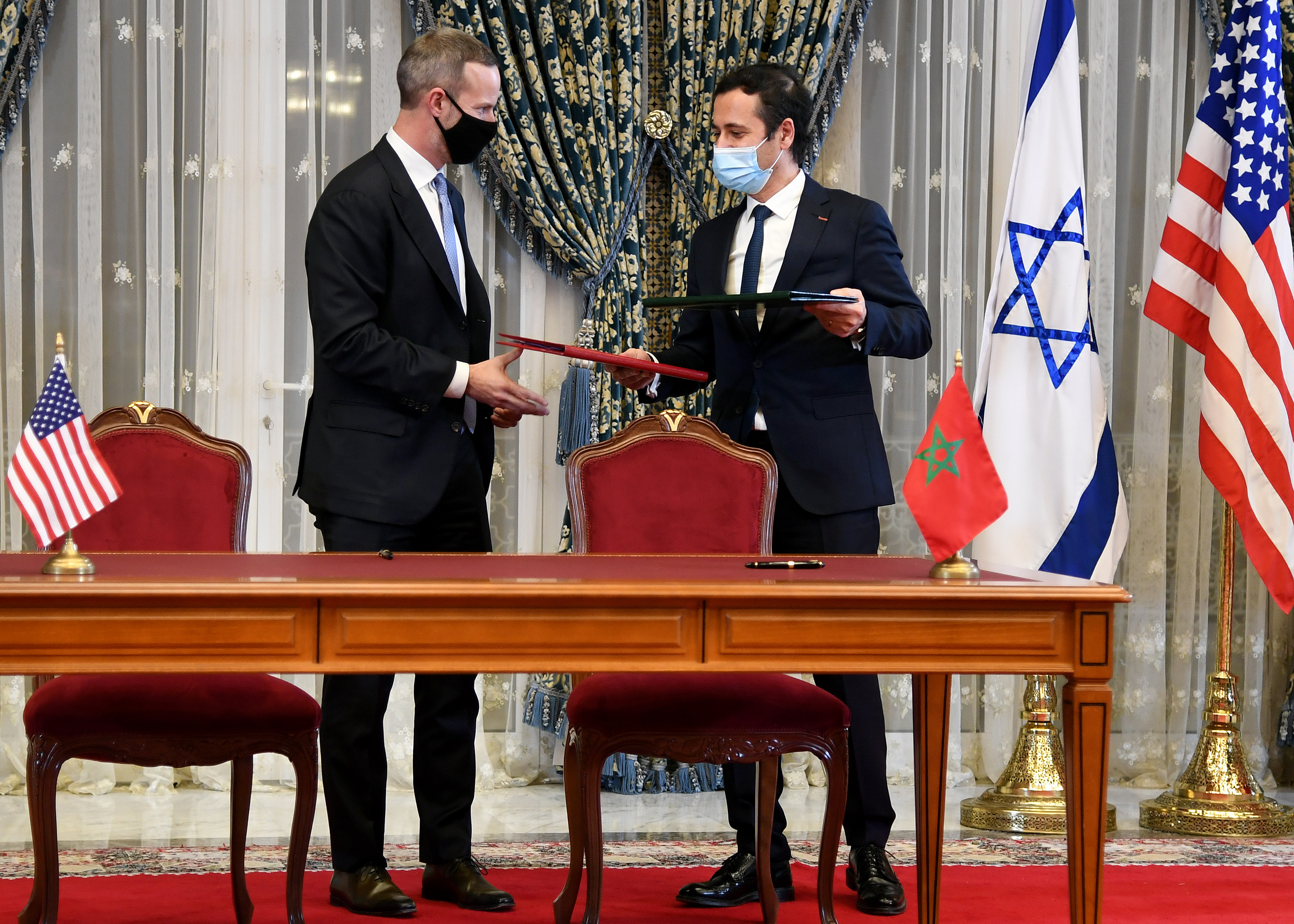
Boehler with Moroccan officials during American-Israeli delegation visit

Boehler was part of several delegations that traveled in 2020 and 2021 with Jared Kushner to Saudi Arabia, UAE and Qatar that ultimately resulted in the Abraham Accords, as well as the agreement to resolve the Gulf Rift. Boehler was part of a high-level delegation to Israel and Morocco to discuss the Israel–Morocco normalization agreement, as well as a delegation in October 2020 with Secretary of Treasury Steven Mnuchin to Israel, Bahrain, and UAE to discuss economic cooperation under the Abraham Accords.

== Post-government career ==
In 2021, Boehler started a health-care investment firm, Rubicon Founders, based in Nashville, Tennessee. The firm is focused on senior living and genomics. He is a member of the United States Holocaust Memorial Council and previously served on the board of directors of the Atlantic Council.

== Second Trump administration (2025–present) ==
On December 4, 2024, President Trump nominated Boehler to serve as Special Presidential Envoy for Hostage Affairs, but Boehler withdrew his nomination on March 15. The White House stated that Boehler would continue to work as a special government employee with the administration on hostage affairs "to ensure that all U.S. nationals held abroad under concerning circumstances are given focused attention by the U.S Government and appropriately resolved," the notification says. Boehler was later appointed Special Envoy for Hostage Response by Trump, according to a notification sent to Congress on April 4, 2025.

In March 2025, Boehler led direct negotiations in Qatar with Hamas representatives to secure the release of the last hostages taken by the organization during the October 7 attacks. According to a report in the Israeli paper Yedioth Ahronoth, which Prime Minister Benjamin Netanyahu denied and called "fake news", Netanyahu and his point man on the talks, Strategic Affairs Minister Ron Dermer, leaked that Boehler held talks with Hamas aimed at securing an interim deal to release American captives. IDF’s Unit 8200 signals intelligence unit reportedly learned of the direct talks. Boehler defended his direct talks with Hamas.

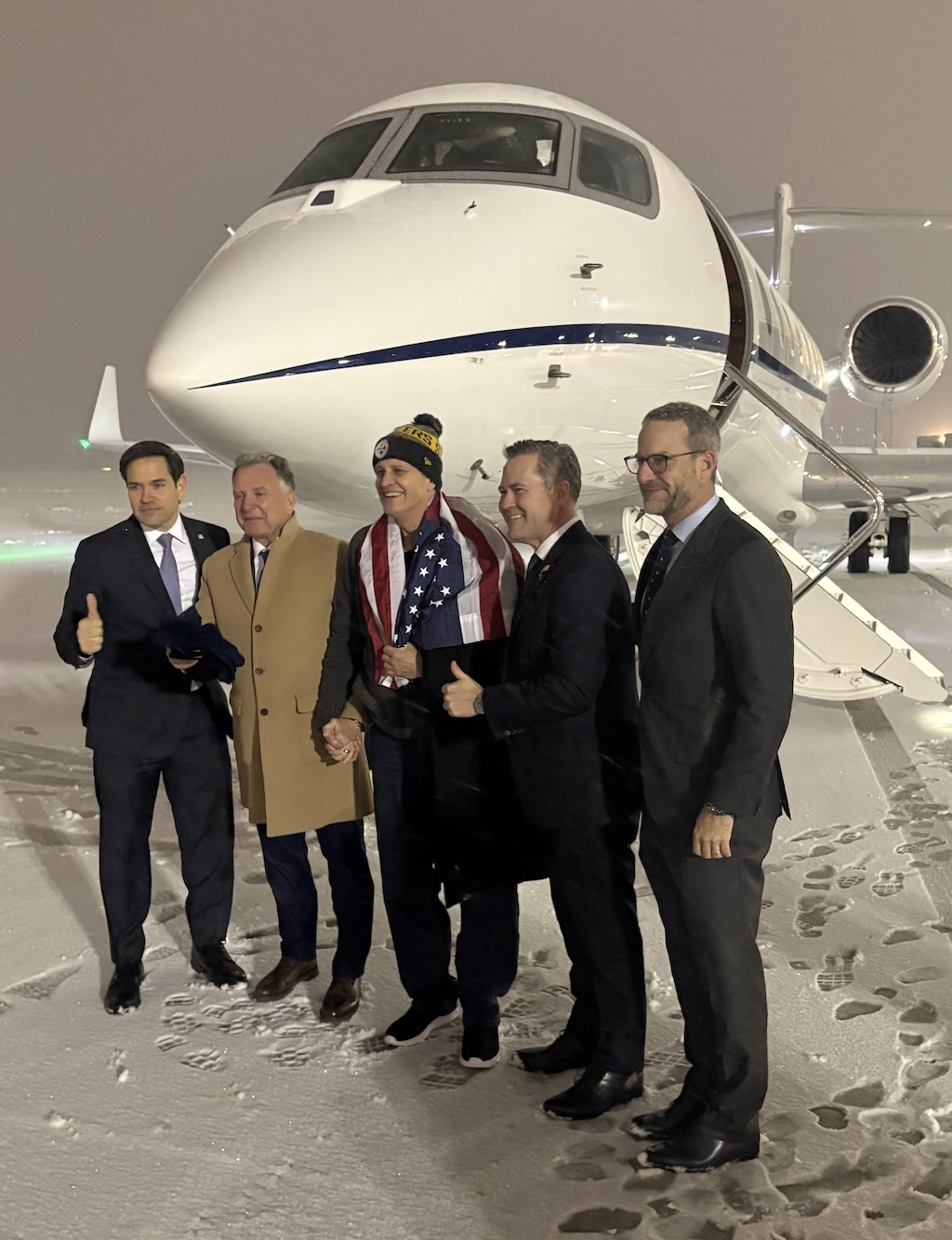
Adam Boehler, Secretary Rubio, Steve Witkoff, and Mike Waltz welcome Marc Fogel upon his return to the United States at Joint Base Andrews.

Boehler negotiated the release of numerous other individuals, including Marc Fogel, an American school teacher detained in Russia on drug charges since August 2021; George Glezmann, a Delta Air Lines mechanic detained by the Taliban for over two years, following high-level talks with Qatari mediators and the Taliban acting foreign minister Amir Khan Muttaqi in Kabul in March 2025; and Ksenia Karelina, a dual U.S.–Russian citizen and former ballerina, who was freed from a Russian prison on April 10, 2025, as part of a prisoner swap with the United States;

Boehler coordinated along with Secretary Rubio and President Nayib Bukele the return of 10 Americans detained in Venezuela to the United States on 18 July 2025.

Boehler assisted with the release of Israeli-Russian hostage Elizabeth Tsurkov by Kata'ib Hezbollah on 9 September 2025.

Boehler negotiated the release of U.S. citizen Amir Amiri by the Taliban on 28 September 2025.

== Personal life ==
Boehler resides in Nashville, Tennessee, with his wife, Shira, and their four children. Boehler formerly resided in New Orleans.
