= Benjamin Black =

Benjamin Black may refer to:

- Benjamin Black, pseudonym used for crime novels by John Banville, Irish novelist
- Benjamin Black (investor), American investor
- Ben Black, Australian rugby league player
