= Center for Medicare and Medicaid Innovation =

The Center for Medicare and Medicaid Innovation (CMMI; also known as the CMS Innovation Center) is an organization of the United States government under the Centers for Medicare and Medicaid Services (CMS). It was created by the Patient Protection and Affordable Care Act, the 2010 U.S. health care legislation. CMS provides healthcare coverage to more than 100 million Americans through Medicare, Medicaid, the Children’s Health Insurance Program (CHIP), and the Health Insurance Marketplace.

"The center is to test innovative payment and delivery system models that show important promise for maintaining or improving the quality of care in Medicare, Medicaid, and the Children's Health Insurance Program (CHIP), while slowing the rate of growth in program costs". The center "is to give priority to twenty models specified in the law, including medical homes, all-payer payment reform, and arrangements that transition from fee-for-service reimbursement to global fees and salary-based payment". It is "intended to overcome antireform inertia by creating a mechanism for the diffusion of successful pilot programs" without requiring Congressional approval.

If a CMMI pilot model is considered successful, the Secretary of Health and Human Services may expand its duration and scope. To be considered a successful test, a model must meet three criteria:

1. The Secretary determines that such expansion is expected to— (A) reduce spending under the applicable title without reducing the quality of care; or (B) improve the quality of patient care without increasing spending;
2. The Chief Actuary of the Centers for Medicare & Medicaid Services certifies that such expansion would reduce (or would not result in any increase in) net program spending under the applicable titles; and
3. The Secretary determines that such expansion would not deny or limit the coverage or provision of benefits under the applicable title for applicable individuals.

Since its founding, CMMI has produced four models that have been certified for expansion based on meeting the above criteria: the Pioneer Accountable Care Organization (ACO) Model, the Medicare Diabetes Prevention Program, the Medicare Prior Authorization Model for Repetitive Scheduled Non-Emergent Ambulance Transport (RSNAT), and, most recently, the Home Health Value-Based Purchasing Model.

There has been criticism by some over the fact that CMMI has only produced the four expanded models in the last decade, despite launching over 50 model tests. Former director Brad Smith stated in a 2021 article that most models did not produce savings and were in fact on pace to lose billions of dollars, a number far larger than the savings generated by the four expanded models.

== Leadership ==
CMMI is currently led by Deputy Administrator and Director Abe Sutton, who formerly served in roles at the National Economic Council, Domestic Policy Council and Department of Health and Human Services during President Trump's first term. Previous directors include Adam Boehler and Patrick H. Conway.
