= Warren Brandt (artist) =

American painter (1918–2002)

- Born: February 26, 1918; Greensboro, North Carolina, USA
- Died: May 5, 2002 (aged 84); Sykesville, Maryland, USA
- Known for: Painting
- Spouse(s): Carolyn Coker (divorced), Grace Borgenicht Brandt

Warren Brandt (February 26, 1918 – May 5, 2002) was an American painter who made significant contributions to modern realism. As an educator, he played a pioneering role in establishing formal art programs at several state universities in the American South and Midwest during the 1950s. While his early career showed influences of abstract expressionism, he later developed a distinctive figurative style inspired by Henri Matisse. Brandt specialized in domestic scenes and still lifes, characterized by vibrant colors and carefully structured compositions. His work is held in numerous art institutions and private collections across the United States.

== Early life, education, and military ==
Warren Brandt was born on February 26, 1918, in Greensboro, North Carolina, the youngest of seven children. His father, Leon Joseph Brandt, was a cotton farmer who had served as mayor of Greensboro from 1907 to 1909, and his mother, Jessie Wooding, was a Virginia native. His father died at age 49 from influenza and pneumonia when Warren was not quite two years old. From his earliest memory, Brandt aspired to be an artist. Though he was a talented football player, whose team tied for the state championship in his senior year, his passion for art was stronger. With just seven dollars in his pocket and determined to study art he hitchhiked to New York City in 1935.

Brandt began his formal art education by attending night classes at Pratt Institute in Brooklyn from 1935 to 1937, while making deliveries in the garment district by day. In 1938 he hitchhiked again, this time to California, where he worked in animation for Walt Disney for one year.

His studies were interrupted by World War II, during which he served in the National Guard for one year in 1941, and the U.S. Army (1943–1946) at Fort Bragg as an official portraitist. Following his military service, Brandt returned to New York to study on the G.I. Bill at the Art Students League with Yasuo Kuniyoshi. He then moved to St. Louis, MO to study under notable artists Philip Guston and Max Beckmann at Washington University. After earning his B.F.A. in 1948, he took ten months to study in Rome and Paris on a Milliken Fellowship; between 1951 and 1952 in New York, he took several art history courses at New York University Institute of Fine Arts including a seminar on Goya; then returned to his hometown to complete his M.F.A. at The University of North Carolina at Greensboro in 1953. During this period Brandt made frequent trips from Greensboro to New York where he spent time at the Cedar Tavern, a well-known gathering place for abstract expressionists. There, he developed friendships with several artists, including Franz Kline and Jack Tworkov.

== Academic career ==
Also while pursuing his graduate studies, Brandt made significant contributions to art education by taking on leadership positions at numerous institutions across the United States. His academic career began at Salem College in Winston-Salem, North Carolina, where he served as chairman of the Department of Art (1949–1950). After teaching at alma mater Pratt Institute in Brooklyn (1950–1952) and Guilford College in Greensboro (1952–1956), he went on to chair art departments at several state universities.

As Chairman of the Department of Art at both the University of Mississippi (1957–1959) and Southern Illinois University, Carbondale (1959–1961), Brandt helped to establish formal art programs at these institutions which in the process of building up their two-year bachelor programs to support BFA and MFA studies. At SIU Carbondale he established drawing classes five nights a week, requiring art students to attend at least three. He arranged for prominent painters and sculptors such as John Grillo, Sidney Geist, Reuben Kadish, Paul Burlin, David Slivka, Milton Resnick, and Edward Dugmore, to visit the school. With the support of local art collectors John Russell Mitchell and his wife, who donated $100,000, Brandt established the Mitchell Gallery and its exhibition program. The gallery opened featuring Mitchell's personal collection, which included works by George Bellows, Mary Cassatt, Arthur Bowen Davies, and Maurice Prendergast; as well as paintings on loan by Alexander Brook, Thomas Eakins, Walt Kuhn, and John Henry Twachtman. Later exhibitions showcased work by Brandt's abstract expressionist colleagues from New York. He later returned to New York City where he taught at the School of Visual Arts (1962–1964) and briefly served as director of the New York Studio School (1967).

== Personal life ==
Brandt married magazine editor Carolyn Coker in 1943, and they had a daughter, Isabella. The marriage ended in divorce during his time at Carbondale in 1960. A few months later he met Grace Borgenicht, a painter, art dealer and "early champion of contemporary American art." The couple married during Christmas vacation that same year in Manassas, Virginia, and Brandt became stepfather to her three daughters. After leaving Carbondale, Brandt and Grace divided their time between a Manhattan apartment and a converted potato barn in Water Mill, near East Hampton. In both locations, he maintained separate studio spaces away from their living quarters. His marriage to Borgenicht was described as happy and revitalizing, and filled with artistic collaboration and mutual support. Brandt's family, including his daughter Isabella, played an important role in his life and work, often inspiring and supporting his artistic endeavors. Grace died in June 2001 at age 86, and Brandt died in 2002 in a hospital in Sykesville, MD, after a long illness, at age 84.

== Artistic style ==
Initially influenced by abstract expressionism after seeing a Nicolas de Staël abstraction in 1948 at the Venice Biennale, Brandt's early works were characterized by free-form and expressive styles. Later, he transitioned to a figurative style, drawing inspiration from Matisse, focusing on realism, still life, and interiors, and by 1964 his focus was set on representing the world around him. His work is known for its vibrant colors, structured compositions, and a blend of realism with a personal vision.

=== Significant works ===
- Checker Game, 1967: Oil on canvas, 60" x 50"
- The Artist in his Studio, 1979: Oil on canvas, 64" x 45"
- Berta and Grace, 1966-67: Oil on canvas, 78 1/2" x 92"
- Two Models in Green, 1971: Oil on canvas, 53" x 59"
- White Table, Black Chair, 1977: Oil on canvas, 38" x 44"
- Mexican Plate and Pomegranates, 1981: Oil on canvas, 21" x 28"

== Reception and exhibitions ==
In a comprehensive 1988 review for The New York Times, art critic Phyllis Braff analyzed Brandt's still-life paintings, praising their "luminosity and radiance" and noting their "distinct majesty." She observed how Brandt transcended traditional still-life conventions through his innovative compositions, comparing his structural approach to Cézanne's belief in the independent reality of a painting's design. Braff also noted Matisse's influence in Brandt's handling of depth and surface, particularly in his use of "brilliant, bold color and exotic pattern." The review highlighted his ability to create works that eliminated traditional perspective and gravity, with effects similar to those found in Degas, especially in his pastels.

=== Major exhibitions ===
Brandt's work was extensively exhibited throughout his career, particularly in New York City beginning in 1949. He had multiple shows at prominent galleries including A.M. Sachs Gallery (1966–1975) and Fischbach Gallery (1983–1990). Several institutions mounted retrospectives of his work:

- 1971: Eastern Illinois University, Charleston, Illinois
- 1976: Beaumont Art Museum, Beaumont, Texas
- 1992: Weatherspoon Art Gallery, The University of North Carolina at Greensboro

=== Selected solo exhibitions ===
- A.M. Sachs Gallery, New York: 1966, 1968, 1973, 1975
- David Barnett Gallery, Milwaukee: 1969, 1974, 1980
- Fischbach Gallery, New York: 1983, 1985, 1986, 1988, 1990

== Selected collections ==
Brandt's work is held in several major American art institutions, including:

- Carnegie Museum of Art, Pittsburgh, Pennsylvania
- Guild Hall of East Hampton, East Hampton, New York
- Hirshhorn Museum and Sculpture Garden, Washington, D.C.
- Memorial Art Gallery of the University of Rochester, New York
- Metropolitan Museum of Art, New York City
- Smithsonian American Art Museum, Washington, D.C.
- Weatherspoon Art Museum, The University of North Carolina at Greensboro

== Selected publications ==
- Painting With Oils. Van Nostrand Reinhold, 1971.
- Nudes. New York: The Arts Publisher, 1986.
