= Development Credit Authority =

The Development Credit Authority (DCA) was a program within the United States Agency for International Development (USAID) that used to issue loan guarantees which would act as collateral for private loans. The DCA could issue guarantees up to 50% of the loan. As the credits were backed by the full faith and credit of the U.S. government, private lenders could be assured particularly for loans made in local currency.

It merged with the Overseas Private Investment Corporation (OPIC) to form the U.S. International Development Finance Corporation (DFC) on December 20, 2019.

== History ==
USAID's Development Credit Authority was created in 1999 to mobilize local private capital through the establishment of risk sharing relationships with private financial institutions in countries covered by USAID.

The partial loan guarantees extended by USAID, through the DFC, allowed the U.S. Government to use credit to pursue the development purposes specified under the Foreign Assistance Act (FAA) of 1961, as amended. These guarantees typically cover up to 50% of the principal of loans to entrepreneurs, Small and medium-sized enterprises, and other projects that advance the U.S. Government's international development objectives. Credit assistance's been used in areas such as microenterprise and small enterprise, privatization of public services, infrastructure, efficient and renewable energy, and climate change.

DCAs do not cover interest income lost: In a country that has, for example, a 30% interest rate, the interest income would represent almost 50% of the total loan value and is not insured via the DCA. In this case, the DCA covers 50% of the principal, but only 25% of the total loan exposure.
