= Trump Victory Committee =

Political fundraising committee

- Formation: 2016
- Type: Political action committee
- Affiliations: Donald Trump, Republican National Committee

The Trump Victory Committee was a joint fundraising committee for Donald J. Trump for President (the Donald Trump presidential campaign organization), the Republican National Committee (RNC), and 11 state Republican committees.

== Overview ==
The committee's first fundraising dinners were held on May 24, 2016, in Albuquerque and May 25, 2016, in Los Angeles.

Trump's 2020 reelection campaign merged with the RNC into a single "Trump Victory" entity, sharing office space. By tying Trump's reelection campaign to the RNC, it unified 2020 Republican Party presidential campaign.

== Leadership ==
The fund is nominally headed by Reince Priebus and led by RNC finance chair Lew Eisenberg and Trump campaign finance chair Steve Mnuchin. Its vice chairs were:

- Elliott Broidy
- Woody Johnson, New York Jets owner
- Diane Hendricks, chairwoman of ABC Supply Co.
- Mel Sembler, a shopping mall developer
- Ray Washburne, Dallas-based investor
- Ronald Weiser, former chairman of Michigan Republican Party
- Kimberly Guilfoyle (finance committee), an American political analyst, journalist, attorney, and television news personality who co-hosted The Five on Fox News.
