= Patrick H. Conway =

American physician

Director for the Center for Medicare and Medicaid Innovation
- In office 2013–2017
- Succeeded by: Adam Boehler

CMS Chief Medical Officer
- In office 2011–2017

CMS Innovation Center Director
- In office 2013–2017

CMS Acting Administrator
- In office 2017–2017
- Succeeded by: Seema Verma

President and CEO of Blue Cross Blue Shield of North Carolina
- In office 2017–2019

CEO of Care Solutions at Optum
- In office 2020–2023

CEO of Optum Rx
- Incumbent
- Assumed office 2023

Personal details
- Born: 1974 (age 51–52) College Station, Texas, U.S.
- Spouse: Heather Conway
- Education: Texas A&M University Baylor College of Medicine
- Occupation: Physician

Patrick H. Conway (born 1974) is an American physician and the CEO of Optum as of May 2025. He is a practicing pediatrician formerly serving at the Cincinnati Children's Hospital and Children's National Medical Center. He was the chief medical officer and acting administrator at the Centers for Medicare and Medicaid Services (CMS) leading quality-of-care efforts for the nation. Conway also served as the Director of the Center for Medicare and Medicaid Innovation, and was responsible for new national payment models for Medicare and Medicaid focused on better quality and lower costs.

== Biography ==
Conway was born in College Station, Texas in 1974 and was the youngest of four children. His father was a chemistry professor and his mother was an assistant dean at a business school. He received his bachelor's degree from Texas A&M University, and attended Baylor College of Medicine, followed by his residency at Boston Children's Hospital.

In 2007, Conway came to Washington as a White House fellow and worked for the then Secretary of Health and Human Services, Mike Leavitt. He served as the Deputy Administrator for Innovation and Quality for the Centers for Medicare and Medicaid Services from May 2011 to September 2017 and joined the Blue Cross Blue Shield of North Carolina in October 2017. Conway was CEO of Blue Cross NC from 2017 to 2019, was CEO of Care Solutions at Optum from 2019 to 2023, CEO of Optum Rx from 2023 to May 2025, and has served as Optum CEO since May 2025.

== Advocacy ==
Conway is an advocate of value-based healthcare services. He introduced new payment models for hospitals and doctors under Medicare and led the efforts to measure the quality of care provided by the healthcare professionals, advocating for healthcare providers to be paid for the outcome of care provided rather than the fee-for-service model. Conway also helped create Accountable Care Organizations (ACOs) and the Medicare shared savings program, and led the CMS Innovation Center to transform the Medicare program, moving from zero payments in alternative payment models based on value to over 30% of Medicare payments.

== DWI conviction and resignation ==
On June 22, 2019, Conway was charged with driving erratically on I-85 with his two daughters, ages 7 and 9, in a Cadillac Escalade. A motorist filmed Conway's vehicle swerving in and out of traffic, ultimately crashing into a tractor trailer. The station reported that officers performed field sobriety tests, and Conway had difficulty maintaining his balance during the tests. At the police station, WRAL reported Conway refusing a breath-alcohol test and cursing. He was convicted in North Carolina on October 8, 2019. No one in the crash was injured.

Conway resigned as CEO of Blue Cross and Blue of Shield North Carolina on September 25, 2019 following his arrest. In his resignation, Conway stated that he was ashamed and embarrassed about his actions and pledged to work hard to earn back the trust he had lost for his actions.

== Associations and recognition ==
Conway is a board member of private organizations, Aledade, Intarcia Therapeutics, the Duke-Margolis Center for Health Policy, Help at Home, and Sound Physicians, and has been a member of the National Academy of Medicine since 2014. He has received the President's Distinguished Senior Executive Rank and HHS Secretary's Distinguished Service awards. He is an adjunct professor at the Perelman School of Medicine and has published over 100 peer reviewed articles on health care policy, value-based payment, innovation, delivery system transformation, and other healthcare topics.
