= Debra Black =

American Broadway producer and philanthropist

- Born: Debra Ressler; 1954 or 1955 (age 70–71)
- Education: Barnard College (BA)
- Occupation: Broadway producer
- Spouse: Leon Black
- Children: 4, including Benjamin
- Relatives: Tony Ressler (brother)
- Awards: Tony Award for Best Play (2006, 2008)

Debra Black (née Ressler; born 1954 or 1955) is an American Broadway producer and philanthropist. She is the wife of Leon Black, co-founder of Apollo Global Management.

== Biography ==
Black was born Debra Ressler to New York City lawyer Ira Ressler. She is the sister of Tony Ressler, who co-founded Apollo Global Management with Leon Black. She graduated from Barnard College in 1976. She has four children, including Benjamin, with Leon Black.

Black is a Broadway producer who has been nominated for ten Tony Awards, winning two in the Tony Award for Best Play category for The History Boys (2006) and The Pillow Man (2008).

== Philanthropic activities ==
Black and her husband co-founded the Melanoma Research Alliance, which funds melanoma research worldwide. Black is a melanoma survivor herself.

She was elected a trustee of the Rockefeller University in 2010. In 2015, She was elected a trustee of the Metropolitan Museum of Art. In 2018, she and her husband donated $40 million to the Museum of Modern Art for its renovation and expansion.
