= Benedict I. Lubell =

American oil executive and philanthropist (1909–1996)

- Born: 1909; New York City, U.S.
- Died: December 13, 1996 (aged 87); Milwaukee, Wisconsin, U.S.
- Education: Columbia University; Columbia University Law School
- Occupation: Businessman
- Spouse: Norma Rubenstein (m. 1939)
- Children: 2
- Family: Grace Borgenicht Brandt (sister); Eli M. Black (brother-in-law); Jack Borgenicht (brother-in-law); Leon Black (nephew)

Benedict I. Lubell (1909 – December 13, 1996) was an American oil executive and philanthropist.

== Biography ==
Lubell was born to a Jewish family on the Upper West Side of Manhattan. His father Samuel L. Lubell founded the Bell Oil and Gas Company, an independent oil refiner in Tulsa, Oklahoma and Lubell Brothers, a shirt manufacturer in New York City. He had two sisters: art dealer Grace Borgenicht Brandt (formerly married to Jack Borgenicht) and Shirley Black Kash (formerly married to Eli M. Black). He was a graduate of Columbia College, Phi Beta Kappa, and Columbia University Law School. After school, he practiced law in New York City at Stroock & Stroock & Lavan until 1936, when he joined the family business in Tulsa. In 1965, the family sold Bell Oil and Lubell formed a new oil production company, the Lubell Oil Company, where he worked until his retirement in 1995.

Lubell was a founding trustee of the Tulsa Performing Arts Center, president of the Tulsa Arts Council, and head of Tulsa's Municipal Arts Commission, and served as a director of the National Bank of Tulsa. In 1982, he received the Oklahoma Governor's Arts Award. Lubell Park in Tulsa is named in his honor.

== Personal life ==
In 1939, he married Norma Rubenstein (died 1994), daughter of New York textile executive Jacob A. Rubenstein. They had two children, Ann Lubell Margolis and John Lubell. Lubell died at his home in Milwaukee of emphysema. Services were held at Temple Israel in Tulsa.
