= William H. Lash =

American professor and government official (1961–2006)

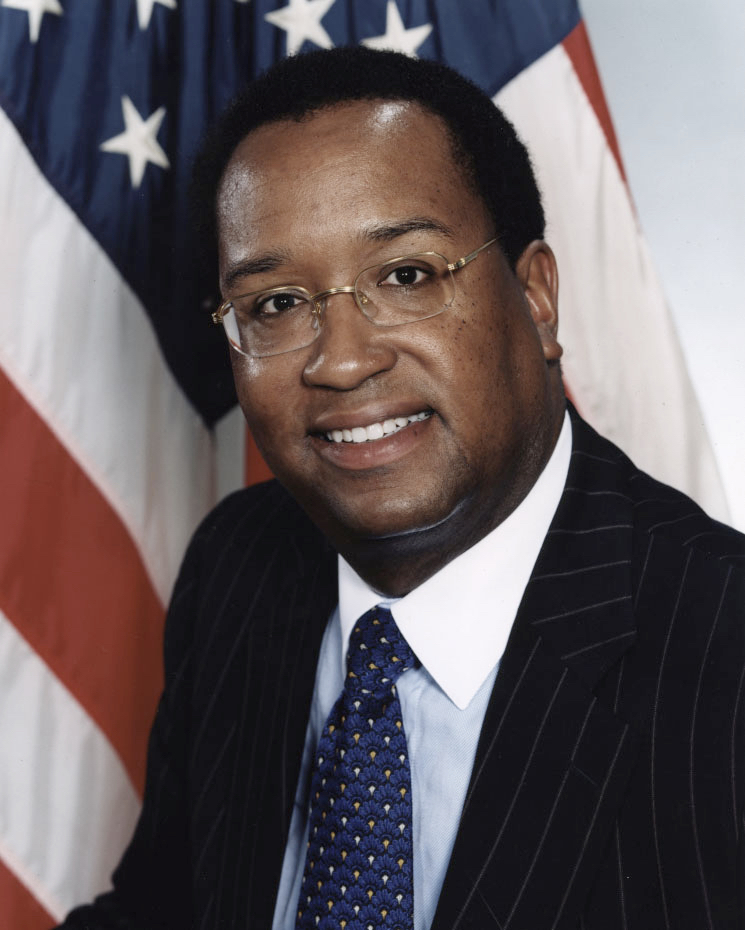
- Official portrait, 2001

Assistant Secretary of Commerce for Market Access and Compliance
- In office July 25, 2001 – August 2005
- President: George W. Bush
- Preceded by: Patrick Mulloy
- Succeeded by: David Bohigian

Personal details
- Born: William Henry Lash III; January 21, 1961 Jersey City, New Jersey, U.S.
- Died: July 14, 2006 (aged 45) McLean, Virginia, U.S.
- Cause of death: Suicide
- Party: Republican
- Spouse: Sharon Zackula
- Education: Yale University (BA); Harvard University (JD)
- Occupation: Lawyer; legal analyst; professor; government official

William Henry Lash III (January 21, 1961 – July 14, 2006) was the Assistant Secretary for Market Access and Compliance at the United States Department of Commerce from 2001 to 2005, and a professor at George Mason University School of Law.

Lash was born in Jersey City, New Jersey and grew up in Rahway, New Jersey.

In July 2006, at his home in McLean, Virginia, Lash was involved in a domestic incident with his wife, which resulted in her leaving the house and calling the police. When they arrived, he refused them entry, and proceeded to fatally shoot his 12-year-old son and then himself.
