= Mi Cocina =

Tex-Mex restaurant chain in the US

Restaurant information
- Established: 1991
- Owner: M Crowd Restaurant Group
- Food type: Tex-Mex cuisine
- Location: Dallas, Texas, United States
- Other locations: Highland Park Village; Klyde Warren Park; River Oaks (Houston)

Mi Cocina is a Tex-Mex restaurant.

== History ==
Chef Michael "Mico" Rodriguez, with $77,500 in backing from Ray Washburne, Dick Washburne, and Bob McNutt, opened the first location of Mi Cocina in the summer of 1991 at Preston Road and Forest Lane in Dallas. It accepted Visa credit cards, which was uncommon for a restaurant then. The original restaurant was still operational as of 2021.

The restaurant expanded to Highland Park Village in 1993. By 1999, the Dallas Morning News called this location "the most popular 'see and be seen' Tex-Mex restaurant" in Texas, popular with celebrities such as Dallas Cowboys players.

Rodriguez left under acrimonious terms in 2009 over accusations he stole from the company.

Mi Cocina opened a new restaurant within Klyde Warren Park in October 2021. In early 2022, its Uptown Dallas location relocated to McKinney Avenue.

The parent company, M Crowd Restaurant Group, sales reached $120 million in 2023. The Dallas Morning News credits Mi Cocina with bringing attention to Tex-Mex food.

The restaurant expanded to Houston in November 2023 with a new 10,000-square-foot location in River Oaks, the largest of its 24 restaurants.

== Cuisine ==
Mi Cocina serves Tex-Mex cuisine, such as tacos, fajita plates, enchiladas, and margaritas.

=== Mambo Taxi ===
The restaurant is known for its signature "Mambo Taxi", a frozen margarita with a sangria swirl. Mi Cocina and its sister restaurant, Taco Diner, served nearly 1.2 million Mambo Taxis in 2018.

In a 2019 poll, D Magazine readers named the Mambo Taxi Dallas's favorite margarita. The margarita is associated with a famous saying, "With 1, you’re feeling good, with 2, you’re doing the Mambo, and with 3, you need a taxi!" The drink was featured on an episode of Conan in 2014.

== Taco Diner ==
In the late 1990s, Mi Cocina's parent company, M Crowd Restaurant Group, opened sibling restaurant Taco Diner, which served Mexico City-style tacos and Mambo Taxis in Dallas. It was known as a rare spot to eat sit-down tacos in Dallas. After most of its locations closed between 2019 and 2021, the last location shut its doors on January 13, 2024.

== See also ==
- List of restaurants in Dallas
- List of Tex-Mex restaurants
