= Ruth Borgenicht =

American ceramic artist

- Born: 1967 (age 58–59)
- Education: B.S. Rutgers University
- Children: 2
- Parent: Jack Borgenicht
- Relatives: Grace Borgenicht Brandt (stepmother)
- Awards: New Jersey State Council on the Arts Fellowship (2005)

Ruth Borgenicht is an American ceramic artist who works mainly with chain mail forms made through a series of interlocking rings.

== Biography ==
Borgenicht (b. 1967) is the daughter of Jack Borgenicht (previously married to Grace Borgenicht Brandt). She graduated in 1991 from Rutgers University in New Brunswick, New Jersey with a bachelor's degree in Mathematics. In 2016, she received an M.F.A. from Montclair State University. She has exhibited internationally at such locations as Carouge, Switzerland, Rotterdam, Netherlands, and Chicago. She lives in Glen Ridge, New Jersey. She has two children, Marcella and Eli.

== Artist Residencies and Fellowships ==
New Jersey State Council on the Arts, Individual Artist Fellowship, 2023
