= Eli M. Black =

American businessman (1921–1975)

- Born: Elihu Menashe Blachowicz; April 9, 1921; Lublin, Poland
- Died: February 3, 1975 (aged 53); New York City, U.S.
- Education: Yeshiva University (BA)
- Occupation: Businessman
- Spouse: Shirley Lubell
- Children: 2, including Leon Black
- Family: Benedict I. Lubell (brother-in-law); Grace Borgenicht Brandt (sister-in-law)

Eli Menashe Black (April 9, 1921–February 3, 1975) was an American businessman who controlled the United Brands Company, now known as Chiquita. His son Leon Black co-founded the private equity firm Apollo Global Management.

== Early life and education ==
Born Elihu Menashe Blachowicz as the youngest of three children to Chaje Schulson and Benzion “Benjamin” Blachowicz in Lublin, Poland, he immigrated to the United States along with his mother and sisters via the boat SS Republic on February 19, 1925, to join their father in New York City. The Yiddish-speaking family lived in Lower East Side, where his father worked as a shohet. He attended Yeshiva University, and graduated at the top of his class in 1940. He also received training to be an Orthodox Jewish rabbi and served as the rabbi of a congregation in Woodmere, New York for three and a half years prior to entering business.

== Business career ==
Black's business career began in investment banking with Lehman Brothers, and then the American Securities Corporation, where he worked on financing for the American Seal-Kap Company, a company that made caps for milk bottles. He was hired to be their chairman and chief executive officer in 1954. Black renamed the company AMK, after its ticker symbol, and turned it into a vehicle for acquisitions, joining the conglomerate bandwagon of the 1960s. Among his many takeovers was the John Morrell & Co. meatpacking company. AMK joined the nation's top 500 companies in 1967. In September 1968, Black bought 10% of the outstanding shares of United Fruit on the open market, while outbidding other companies, and gained a controlling interest.

In 1970, AMK merged with United Fruit Company, and adopted the name United Brands. Black became chairman, president, and CEO. At that time, United Fruit was importing about a third of all the bananas sold in the US and owned the Chiquita banana brand. But Black soon discovered United Fruit had far less capital than he had believed. The company soon became crippled with debt. The company's losses were exacerbated by Hurricane Fifi in 1974, which destroyed many of its banana plantations in Honduras. In 1974, United Brands reported losses of $40 million for the first three quarters of the year. Black struggled to keep the company solvent, and in December United Brands announced it was selling its interest in Foster Grant, Inc. for $70 million.

== Death ==
On February 3, 1975, Black went to his office on the forty-fourth floor of the Pan Am Building in Manhattan. At about 8:00 a.m., he fell to his death, landing on the northbound Park Avenue Viaduct beside motorists. Homicide detectives concluded that the quarter-inch glass window was broken with Black's attaché case and classified his death a suicide. A few weeks later the Securities and Exchange Commission uncovered a $1.25 million bribe that United Brands paid to Honduran president Oswaldo López Arellano under authorization by Black in order to obtain a reduction of taxes on banana exports.

After Black's death, Seymour Milstein and Paul Milstein bought into United Fruit.

== Personal life ==
Black was married to artist Shirley Lubell (sister of Oklahoma oil executive Benedict I. Lubell and art dealer Grace Borgenicht Brandt). They had two children: daughter Judy Schlosberg and son Leon Black, founding member of private equity firm Apollo Management.

Black served as a trustee of the Lincoln Center for the Performing Arts, The American Jewish Committee, the Federation of Jewish Philanthropies, Babson College, the Jewish Guild for the Blind, and the Jewish Museum. He had also served as chairman of the Commentary Magazine publication committee. The Eli M. Black Lifelong Learning Center at the Park Avenue Synagogue is named in his honor.

== Cultural references ==
The 1994 film The Hudsucker Proxy included a scene resembling Black's suicide.

== See also ==
- Union of Banana Exporting Countries
