= Miriam Borgenicht =

American writer

- Born: July 22, 1915; Manhattan
- Died: April 23, 1992 (aged 76); Manhattan
- Other name: Miriam Borgenicht Klein
- Education: Barnard College
- Occupation: Writer
- Spouse(s): Milton Klein, lawyer
- Children: 5
- Parent(s): Max Borgenicht and Helen Gottesman

Miriam Borgenicht (July 22, 1915 − April 23, 1992) was an American writer of mystery novels. A 1936 graduate of Barnard College in New York City, she worked for the Works Progress Administration during the Great Depression. She married Milton Klein, a lawyer, and had five children.

In addition to her novels, she wrote articles for magazines including The New Yorker, McCall's, Parents, and The New Republic. She died in Manhattan in 1992.

== Critical reviews ==
In general, reviewers of Borgenicht's novels praised aspects of the fiction but also expressed reservations. Kirkus Reviews found Borgenicht's first novel, A Corpse in Diplomacy, "Fast paced but feminine". Pearl G. Aldrich, writing in Twentieth-Century Crime and Mystery Writers, said of Borgenicht's first 10 novels, "They tread a very thin line, each wavering back and forth from competent to inept, credible to ridiculous, interesting to boring." A reviewer for Publishers Weekly said of No Duress, "The villains will be obvious to even neophyte armchair sleuths, but Borgenicht's perceptive comments on troubling social issues generate plenty of tension." A Publishers Weekly reviewer said of Undue Influence that it was "well-crafted" and featured "strong characters" but that it lost suspense in the closing chapters via a plot twist that was "too sudden and convenient".

== Bibliography ==
- A Corpse in Diplomacy (1949) OCLC 1577091
- Ring and Walk in (1952) OCLC 1704392
- Don't Look Back (1956) OCLC 1446212
- To Borrow Trouble (1965) OCLC 1862512
- Extreme Remedies (1967) OCLC 1436377
- Margin for Doubt (1968) OCLC 436845
- The Tomorrow Trap (1969) OCLC 4441
- A Very Thin Line (1970) OCLC 92749
- Roadblock (1973) OCLC 721158
- No Bail for Dalton (1974) OCLC 729985265
- True or False? (1982) OCLC 8410601
- Bad Medicine (1984) OCLC 15017989
- Fall from Grace (1984) OCLC 10274605
- Still Life (1986) OCLC 13700968
- Undue Influence (1989) OCLC 1036900274
- No Duress (1991) OCLC 22984729
- False Colors (1985) OCLC 1034665615
- Booked for Death (1987) OCLC 16079965
