= Presidential transition of Donald Trump =

Presidential transition of Donald Trump may refer to:

- First presidential transition of Donald Trump (2016–2017)
- Second presidential transition of Donald Trump (2024–2025)
