= Jack Borgenicht =

American entrepreneur (1911–2005)

- Born: August 29, 1911; Manhattan, New York City
- Died: August 25, 2005 (aged 93); Long Valley, New Jersey
- Organization(s): Jack Borgenicht, Inc.
- Spouses: Grace Borgenicht Brandt (m. 1938, divorced) Peri Borgenicht (m. 1954; div. 1964): Dale Borgenicht Blum; Fran Bennett Borgenicht (m. 1995)
- Children: 10, including Ruth Borgenicht

Jacob 'Jack' Moses Borgenicht (August 29, 1911 – August 25, 2005) was an American entrepreneur, land use preservation activist, garment manufacturer, millionaire, restaurant owner, philanthropist and mountaineer. He held the record for oldest person to climb Mount Rainier between 1992 and 2007.

== Biography ==
He was born Jacob Moses Borgenicht to a Jewish family in Manhattan, New York. He was the youngest of 14 siblings born to prominent garment manufacturers Regina (née Reich) and Louis Borgenicht, both from Austria-Hungary, Regina being from Presov, Transleithania and Louis from Zakliczyn, Galicia. He grew up in Hunter, New York, and spent two years attending New York University.

=== Career ===
He dropped out of college during the Great Depression to help the family clothing manufacturing company Borgenicht and Spiro. He formed his own company, Jack Borgenicht Inc., in 1944.

=== Mountain climbing ===
Starting at the age of 78, Borgenicht and his climbing partner, College of William and Mary kinesiology professor Ken Kambis, climbed Mount Elbert and on August 30, 1992, he became the oldest person to climb Mount Rainier at age 81, with additional plans to climb Mount Kiliminjaro and Mount Everest. He held that record until 2007.

=== Marriage and children ===
Borgenicht was married four times; once to Grace Borgenicht Brandt (m. 1938) art gallery owner, and then three others. On March 26, 1954, he married Peri Gilbert Borgenicht Winkler, stockbroker, literary agent; they divorced in 1964. He then married Dale Borgenicht Blum, award and antique shop owner. His fourth wife was Fran Bennett Borgenicht (m. 1995) Broadway producer. He had twelve children including ceramic artist Ruth Borgenicht and painter Lois Borgenicht.

=== Legacy ===
On his death, he arranged to make multi-million dollar charitable donations to the College of William and Mary to fund the Foundation for Aging Studies and Exercise Science Research and a Hypoxia/Altitude Physiology Research Facility

Five years after his death, the New Jersey Conservation Foundation and its partners, including the Morris County Open Space Trust Fund, bought his 228-acre estate in Long Valley, New Jersey for $2.8 million for open space preservation.

== Philosophical and/or political views ==
Borgenicht has stated that The Anatomy of Peace by Emery Reves expresses his philosophy best. Winston Churchill and Yasser Arafat were his role models.
