= Grace Borgenicht Brandt =

American art dealer (1915–2001)

- Born: Grace Lubell; January 25, 1915; New York City, U.S.
- Died: July 19, 2001 (aged 86); New York City, U.S.
- Education: Columbia University (BA, MA)
- Occupations: Art dealer Painter
- Spouse(s): Jack Borgenicht (m. 1938; divorced 1954); Norman Sachs Jr. (divorced); Warren Brandt
- Children: 3
- Family: Benedict I. Lubell (brother); Orin Kerr (grandson); Eli M. Black (brother-in-law); Leon Black (nephew)

Grace Borgenicht Brandt (January 25, 1915 – July 19, 2001) was an American art dealer.

== Biography ==
Brandt was born Grace Lubell on January 25, 1915, as one of five children to a Jewish family in New York City. Her parents, Jeanette Lillian Salny and Samuel L. Lubell (born Samuel Lazarus Lubelsky), were both from Suwałki Governorate, Congress Poland. Samuel founded the Bell Oil and Gas Company, an independent oil refiner in Tulsa, Oklahoma, and Lubell Brothers, a shirt manufacturer in New York City. Her siblings include oil executive Benedict I. Lubell and Shirley Black Kash (formerly married to Eli M. Black).

She attended Calhoun School and the New College at Columbia University. In 1934, while still a student, she studied in the studio of the painter André L'Hote in Paris. After returning to New York, she studied printmaking at Stanley William Hayter's Atelier 17 and earned a M.A. in art education from Columbia.

After school, she painted professionally, having her first solo show at Chris Ritter's Laurel Gallery in 1947 and later became one of Ritter's primary financial backers. After Ritter closed the Laurel Gallery in 1950, Brandt opened her own gallery, The Grace Borgenicht Gallery, in May 1951. Her gallery focused on living American artists including Milton Avery, Ilya Bolotowsky, Jimmy Ernst, Wolf Kahn, Gabor Peterdi, Leonard Baskin, Edward Corbett, and Ralston Crawford. She represented Avery until his death in 1965 and also represented Gertrude Greene, José de Rivera, Adja Yunkers, James Brooks and Roy Gussow. In 1995, she closed her gallery.

Although known as an art dealer, she continued to paint and showed her work in the 1954 Whitney Annual and had a solo show at the Martha Jackson Gallery in 1955.

== Personal life ==
Brandt married three times. Between January 20, 1938 and 1954, she was married to dress manufacturer Jack Borgenicht; they had three daughters before divorcing, Jan Borgenicht Schwartz, Berta Borgenicht Kerr, and Lois Borgenicht. (Jack would go on to have seven more children including artist Ruth Borgenicht). On July 17, 1956, she married her second husband Norman Sachs Jr., divorcing in December 1960. The same month, on December 26, she married her third husband, artist Warren Brandt. She had a stepdaughter, Isabella Brandt Johansen She lived in Manhattan and Watermill, New York. Brandt died in Manhattan on July 19, 2001, at the age of 86 after an accidental fall. Services were held at the Riverside Memorial Chapel.
