= U.S. International Development Finance Corporation =

US federal agency responsible for providing foreign aid

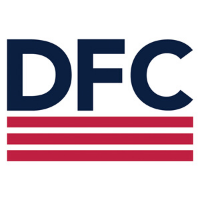

Agency overview
- Formed: December 20, 2019
- Preceding agency: Overseas Private Investment Corporation (OPIC) and Development Credit Authority (DCA) of the United States Agency for International Development (USAID)
- Headquarters: Washington, D.C.
- Motto: Investing in Development
- Annual budget: $1 billion (FY 2026)
- Agency executives: Benjamin Black, Chief Executive Officer; Vacant, Deputy Chief Executive Officer
- Website: www.dfc.gov

The United States International Development Finance Corporation (DFC) is an agency of the United States federal government that invests in development projects primarily in lower and middle-income countries. First authorized on October 5, 2018, by the BUILD Act, the independent agency was formed on December 20, 2019 by merging the Overseas Private Investment Corporation (OPIC) with the Development Credit Authority (DCA) of the United States Agency for International Development (USAID), as well as with several other smaller offices and funds. It is considered the U.S. government's "largest overseas investment arm."

The DFC provides loans, loan guarantees, direct equity investments, and political risk insurance to support private-sector-led development projects, as well as funding for feasibility studies and technical assistance. DFC invests across several sectors including energy, healthcare, critical infrastructure, and technology, with stated priorities of women's empowerment, innovation, investment in West Africa and the Western Hemisphere, and climate change.

== Purpose ==
The DFC seeks to promote private sector investment and expertise in the economic development of countries that are either developing or transitioning to market-based economies. Its activities are intended to support U.S. development assistance and foreign policy goals. In evaluating projects for financial support, the DFC considers both their economic and financial viability and their potential development impact.

== History ==
U.S. development finance efforts were consolidated under the Overseas Private Investment Corporation (OPIC) in 1969 by President Richard Nixon, transferring responsibility from the United States Agency for International Development (USAID). The goal was to promote a more business-like management of development finance policy. During the 2010s, the Obama administration supported further consolidation of U.S. development finance in response to growing Chinese investment in developing countries, particularly through the Belt and Road Initiative.

The Trump administration originally opposed OPIC, and its proposed 2018 budget had called for the elimination of OPIC altogether, but advocacy by some administration officials, senators, and others convinced the White House to support the consolidation of OPIC and development finance efforts in line with the President's policy priorities. Shortly thereafter, the Better Utilization of Investments Leading to Development (BUILD) Act was written to establish the DFC.

=== The BUILD Act ===
The BUILD Act was introduced in the House and Senate in February 2018 with broad bipartisan support, based on proposals drafted by researchers at the Center for Global Development. It was passed in the House and then passed the Senate as a part of a bill to reauthorize the Federal Aviation Administration on a vote of 93–6 in early October 2018. It was signed into law by President Trump on October 5.

Concerns about growing Chinese investment abroad and the limits of U.S. development finance helped drive the Act's passage. The new DFC is largely seen as a way to counter China, especially its Belt and Road Initiative.

The BUILD Act was intended to address limitations in existing U.S. development finance policy, particularly those affecting OPIC. Unlike OPIC, the Act permits the DFC to make equity investments, reduces U.S. citizenship requirements for investment participants, allows the agency to assume greater risk on individual projects, and enables lending in local currencies. DFC's total spending cap for its investments was also raised to $60 billion, compared to $29 billion for OPIC.

=== Reauthorization ===
For the DFC to continue operating, it required congressional reauthorization by October 6, 2025. This was achieved via the DFC Modernization and Reauthorization Act of 2025, which was ultimately enacted as part of the FY2026 National Defense Authorization Act (NDAA).

The reauthorization extended the agency's mandate for six years (through the end of 2031) and raised its maximum contingent liability, the cap on its outstanding investment exposure, from $60 billion to $205 billion. It also created a $5 billion equity revolving fund and increased the DFC's equity investment authority to permit minority ownership stakes of up to 40 percent.

The reauthorization also expanded the geographic scope of DFC's investment authority to cover all countries other than the twenty highest-income nations. Investments in those countries remain permitted in two circumstances: when made in the Five Eyes countries and their territories, and when made in the energy, critical minerals and rare earths, or information and communications technology sectors (including undersea cables).

The Center for Strategic and International Studies (CSIS) proposed doubling the spending cap to $120bn and giving the institution more independence as part of reauthorisation.

== Investments and priorities ==
The DFC invests in sectors such as sanitation, infrastructure, healthcare, and food security. Its broader investment priorities include promoting innovation, supporting sustainable employment, protecting workers' rights, advancing women's economic empowerment, and strengthening global supply chains. The DFC states that its investments aim to advance global development, U.S. foreign policy, and U.S. taxpayer interests.

Specific initiatives of the DFC include the 2X Women's Initiative, inherited from OPIC, that focuses on women-owned businesses and/or products and services designed to empower women. DFC has collaborated with USAID and other U.S. agencies in the Power Africa program, which has facilitated power sector deals across the continent, and the Prosper Africa Initiative, launched in 2018 with the goal of promoting U.S.-Africa investment and trade, countering Chinese influence.

=== Response to COVID-19 ===
On May 14, 2020, President Trump signed an Executive Order that delegated authority to the DFC Chief Executive Officer to make loans to private institutions to support the response to COVID-19 or strengthen relevant supply chains. The Trump administration, through the DFC, announced a $765 million loan to Kodak to make drug ingredients, aiming to rebuild supplies drained by COVID-19 and cut reliance on foreign factories. The funding was put on hold as the U.S. Securities and Exchange Commission began probing allegations of insider trading by Kodak executives ahead of the deal's announcement, and DFC's inspector general announced scrutiny into the loan terms. The agency received criticism for the loan deal.

The agency has also given millions of dollars to ApiJect Systems.

=== Active Projects ===
The Active Projects Database shows a selection of recent DFC commitments.

Year	Project	Country	Instrument	$ USD
2024	ProCredit Bank Ukraine	Ukraine	Finance	$28.0M
2024	Savannah Niger Wind Farm	Niger	Project Development	$1.2M
2025	Pula Advisors TA	Worldwide	Project Development	$4.8M
2025	Millennial Potash Banio Project	Gabon	Project Development	$3.0M
2026	Orion CMC USA LP	Worldwide	Finance	$500M
2026	Capital Sisters International, Inc.	Philippines	Insurance	$475k

== Leadership ==
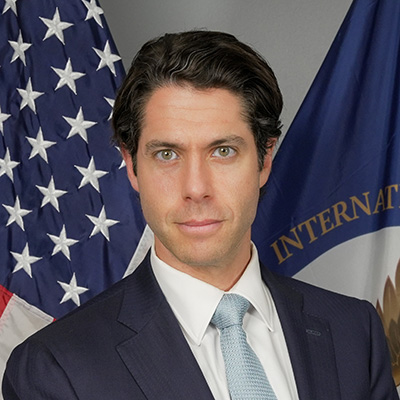
Benjamin Black, CEO since 2025

On June 18, 2025, Benjamin Black was nominated by President Donald Trump to serve as CEO, and was confirmed on October 7, 2025.

The prior CEO, Scott Nathan, was nominated by the Biden-Harris Administration in September 2021 and was confirmed February 9, 2022.

No.	CEO	Tenure
1	Adam S. Boehler	October 1, 2019 – January 20, 2021
–	Dev Jagadesan (Acting)	January 20, 2021 – February 9, 2022
2	Scott A. Nathan	February 9, 2022 – January 20, 2025
–	Dev Jagadesan (Acting)	January 20, 2025 – October 7, 2025
3	Benjamin Black	October 7, 2025 – Present

The position of deputy CEO was first filled in 2023 by Nisha Desai Biswal.

No.	Deputy CEO	Tenure
1	Nisha Desai Biswal	August 14, 2023 – January 20, 2025

=== Board of Directors ===
The board of directors is composed of nine members, four appointed by the president of the United States with the consent of the United States Senate and five ex officio members. The five ex officio members are the CEO of the DFC, the U.S. secretary of state, the administrator of the United States Agency for International Development, the U.S. secretary of the treasury, and the U.S. secretary of commerce. Apart from the CEO, these may be represented on the board by their designees. A designee must be from among officers who are appointed by the President, by and with the advice and consent of the Senate; whose duties relate to the programs of the Corporation; and who is designated by and serving at the pleasure of the President.

Of the four appointed members, one each shall be appointed from lists of at least five individuals submitted by the speaker, and minority and majority leader of the House of Representatives and Senate, respectively. In making their lists, they shall consult with their parties' leader on the Committee on Foreign Affairs and Committee on Foreign Relations, respectively. These members may not be an officer or employee of the U.S. government, and shall have relevant experience, which may include experience relating to the private sector, the environment, labor organizations, or international development.

These four serve terms of three years, and may be reappointed to one additional term. They may continue to serve after the expiration of each of their terms of office until a successor has been confirmed.

The secretary of state, or their designee, serves as the chairperson of the board. The administrator of USAID, or their designee, serves as the vice chairperson. A majority of the members of the board constitutes a quorum.

=== Current board members ===
The current board members as of May 15, 2026:

Position	Name	Party	Assumed office	Term expiration
Chair (ex officio) Secretary of State	Marco Rubio	Republican	January 21, 2025	—
Vice chair (ex officio) Administrator of USAID	Eric Ueland	Republican	November 24, 2025	—
Member (ex officio) CEO of the DFC	Benjamin Black	Republican	October 7, 2025	—
Member (ex officio) Secretary of the Treasury	Scott Bessent	Republican	January 28, 2025	—
Member (ex officio) Secretary of Commerce	Howard Lutnick	Republican	February 21, 2025	—
Member	Christopher P. Vincze	Republican	June 13, 2019	December 17, 2019
Member	Deven J. Parekh	Democratic	December 16, 2020	December 16, 2023
Member	Irving W. Bailey II	Republican	December 16, 2020	December 16, 2023
Member	Vacant			

== Analysis ==
Commentators have criticised the DFC's investments in upper-middle-income countries that are apparently intended to achieve U.S. foreign policy objectives other than international development, describing these investments as mission creep.

Scott Morris of the Center for Global Development has criticised federal budget rules that require the DFC to treat equity investments as expenditures "with no offsetting allowance for [their] expected financial returns," unlike loans, which are budgeted based on their subsidy costs.

Publishing in 2026, academic David M. Lampton writes that the fund's ability to invest in Asia had hampered by the second Trump administration's reduction in the government's capacity for international development assistance and export finance.

== See also ==
- Export–Import Bank of the United States
