= Schmieder v. Barney =

- Supreme Court of the United States

Argued November 26, 1884 Decided March 2, 1885
- Full case name: Schmieder v. Barney
- Citations: 113 U.S. 645 (more) 5 S. Ct. 624; 28 L. Ed. 1130

Court membership
- Chief Justice Morrison Waite Associate Justices Samuel F. Miller · Stephen J. Field; Joseph P. Bradley · John M. Harlan; William B. Woods · Stanley Matthews; Horace Gray · Samuel Blatchford

Case opinion
- Majority: Waite, joined by unanimous

Schmieder v. Barney, 113 U.S. 645 (1885), regards the act of July 14, 1862, § 9, 12 Stat. 553, which imposes a duty, "On all delaines . . . and on all goods of similar description, not exceeding in value forty cents per square yard, two cents per square yard." Held that the similarity required is a similarity in product, in adaptation to uses, and in uses, even though in commerce they may be classed as different articles; affirming Greenleaf v. Goodrich.

The court found that it was competent to inquire of a witness in a suit to recover back duties paid under this clause of the act of 1862 whether the words "of similar description" is a commercial term, and if so what is its commercial meaning; but it was not competent to inquire whether the particular goods, alleged to have been improperly subjected to duty, were of similar description to delaines.

It was contended in this case that the plaintiffs in error went further than was done and that they offered to prove that in commerce "Saxony dress goods" were not considered as of "similar description" to delaines. It is argued that this brings the case within what should be taken as an exception reserved in the former decision. The exception claimed is drawn from the following clause in the opinion:

The record exhibits nothing tending to show what was commonly understood among merchants as distinguishing goods, known in commerce as of a similar description with delaines, from all other goods. Nor was there any evidence that there were any goods known by merchants, or in commerce, as goods of similar description with delaines; much less was it in proof that being woven in the gray was regarded by merchants as determining that goods so woven were not of similar description with delaines. In regard to all these matters, the record is silent. Composed, as the goods were, of the same materials as delaines, having a similar general appearance, and intended for the same uses, they might well have been of similar description with colored delaines, though there were differences in the process of manufacture.

Undoubtedly the language of tariff acts is to be construed according to its commercial signification, but it will always be understood to have the same meaning in commerce that it has in the community at large, unless the contrary is shown. Swan v. Arthur, 103 U. S. 598. The most that can be claimed for the alleged reservation in Greenleaf v. Goodrich is that it would have been proper to inquire whether the phrase "of similar description" was a commercial term, and if so what it was understood by merchants and importers to mean. That, however, is not what was attempted in this case. The witnesses were asked in effect not what the words "of similar description" were understood among commercial men to mean, but whether the goods of these importers were known in commerce as goods of similar description to delaines.

The effort was to put the opinion of commercial experts in the place of that of the jury upon a question which was as well understood by the community at large as by merchants and importers. This it was decided in Greenleaf v. Goodrich could not be done, and upon the point supposed to have been reserved in that decision, this case stands just where that did. The testimony offered was therefore properly rejected.

The opinions of the collector of the port and of the board of official appraisers were no more admissible on this question than those of any other competent experts.

The judgment was affirmed.

== See also ==
- List of United States Supreme Court cases, volume 113
