= Gregory v. Hartley =

- Supreme Court of the United States

Argued December 9, 1884 Decided March 16, 1885
- Full case name: Gregory v. Hartley
- Citations: 113 U.S. 742 (more) 5 S. Ct. 743; 28 L. Ed. 1150

Court membership
- Chief Justice Morrison Waite Associate Justices Samuel F. Miller · Stephen J. Field; Joseph P. Bradley · John M. Harlan; William B. Woods · Stanley Matthews; Horace Gray · Samuel Blatchford

Case opinion
- Majority: Waite, joined by unanimous

Gregory v. Hartley, 113 U.S. 742 (1885), was a case in error to the Supreme Court of the State of Nebraska where it was decided and reaffirmed that the words "term at which said cause could be first tried and before the trial thereof," Act of March 3, 1875, c. 137, § 3, 18 Stat. 471, mean the first term at which the cause is in law triable, i.e., in which it would stand for trial if the parties had taken the usual steps as to pleadings and other preparations. Babbitt v. Clark, 103 U.S. 808, and Pullman Palace Car Co. v. Speck, ante, 113 U.S. 87.

== Decision ==
Chief Justice Waite delivered the opinion of the Court.

This is a writ of error to reverse a judgment of the Supreme Court of Nebraska on the single ground that the supreme court decided that the Court of Appeals of Lancaster County had jurisdiction to proceed with the suit after a petition for the removal thereof to the circuit court of the United States had been made and filed in the district court. The transcript, which has been returned with the writ, is evidently very imperfect, and it purports to contain only a part of the record below. It is not authenticated by the clerk as a full transcript, and it shows on its face that much which is important to a correct understanding of the case has been omitted. From what has been returned, however, it sufficiently appears that the suit was originally brought in the District Court of Lancaster County by Milo F. Kellogg against Luke Lavender, James E. Phillpot, John S. Gregory, E. Mary Gregory, Thomas J. Cantlon, R. F. Parshall, and perhaps some others to enforce the specific performance of a contract in writing, entered into on the 30th of July, 1872, between the plaintiff Kellogg and the defendant Lavender for the sale by Lavender to Kellogg of certain lots in Lincoln, Nebraska. The price to be paid was $2,500. Of this amount, $500 was paid in hand, and for the remaining $2,000 Kellogg executed two notes of $1,000 each, payable to the order of Lavender, one on the first day of May, 1873, and the other on the first day of May, 1874, with interest at the rate of twelve percent per annum. At what time the suit was begun nowhere appears, but an amended petition was filed on the 22d of November, 1879, making Joseph W. Hartley, Reuben R. Tingley, and many others, parties. To this petition Hartley filed an answer and cross-petition on the 2d of December, 1879, Tingley an answer on the 1st of December, 1879, and Parshall an answer and cross-petition at some time before May 17, 1880. The answer and cross-petition of Hartley are found in the record, and from them it appears that he claimed and sought to enforce a lien on the property as security for the payment of money he advanced Kellogg to aid in paying the note due to Lavender in May, 1873. The answer of Tingley and the answer and cross-petition of Parshall are not copied into the transcript. On the 17th of May, 1880, the two Gregorys, Lavender, Cantlon, and Phillpot filed demurrers to the answers and cross-petitions of Hartley and Parshall, and to the answer of Tingley, on the ground that they did not state facts sufficient to constitute a cause of action or a defense.

These demurrers were heard and overruled by the court on the 17th of August, 1880, and thirty days given the demurring defendants to answer.

At the time of the filing of the amended petition, the legal title to the property was in E. Mary Gregory, the wife of J. S. Gregory, Lavender having conveyed it to Phillpot and Cantlon after he made his contract with Kellogg and they having afterwards sold and conveyed it to Mrs. Gregory. On the 28th of November, 1879, Mrs. Gregory settled all matters in dispute with Kellogg, and he assigned to her his contract with Lavender. After this settlement, on the 22d of September, 1880, Mrs. Gregory filed her answer to the amended petition, in which she set up her title to the property and her adjustment of the controversy with Kellogg. On the 27th of September, 1880, Lavender, Phillpot, and Cantlon filed their answer to the cross-petition of Hartley. On the 5th of November, 1880, leave was given Parshall and Tingley to file amended answers in forty days, and on the 13th of December, 1880, Parshall did file his answer and cross-petition, claiming to be the owner of Kellogg's note to Lavender falling due in 1874, and asking to enforce a lien on the property for its payment. At the same time, Tingley filed his answer and cross-petition, in which he claimed an interest in the note due in 1874, and prayed affirmative relief in his own behalf. On the 3d of March, 1881, Lavender, Phillpot, Cantlon, and Mrs. Gregory, with leave of the court, filed a reply to the answer and cross-petition of Parshall. On the 23d of March, 1882, leave was granted Tingley to amend his pleadings, and to Mrs. Gregory to file an amended answer in thirty days. Mrs. Gregory did file her amended answer to the cross-petition of Hartley on the 17th of April, 1882, and, on the 15th of June thereafter, the Gregorys, Lavender, Cantlon, Phillpot, and Kellogg presented their petition for the removal of the cause to the circuit court of the United States. That petition, so far as it is material to the question now under consideration, is as follows:

"Your petitioners now show to this court that the plaintiff herein, Milo F. Kellogg, is a citizen of the State of Missouri; defendant Thos. J. Cantlon is a citizen of the State of Colorado; defendant Reville F. Parshall is a citizen of the State of Wisconsin; defendant J. W. Hartley is a citizen of the State of Ohio, and that defendants E. Mary Gregory, James E. Phillpot, J. S. Gregory, and Luke Lavender are citizens of the State of Nebraska, and that said Thos. J. Cantlon and Reville E. Parshall were nonresidents of the State of Nebraska at the commencement of this action."

"That none of the other defendants in said cause have made any appearance or set up any claims of interest in the cause or controversy, and that the defendants named herein are the only ones appearing to have any interest therein. Your petitioners further represent that no final caring or trial of said cause has been had, but said cause is now pending for trial in this court."

Upon the presentation of this petition, the district court refused to surrender its jurisdiction, and the petitioners excepted. On the 11th of November, 1882, a decree was entered sustaining the several claims of Hartley and Tingley, and establishing liens in their favor on the property in dispute. From this decree the Gregorys, Phillpot, Cantlon and Lavender appealed to the supreme court of the state and assigned for error the refusal of the district court to surrender its jurisdiction on the presentation of the petition for removal. The supreme court sustained the action of the district court, and to review that decision this writ of error was brought.

To our minds it is very clear that there was no error in the rulings of the courts below upon the federal question involved, which alone can be considered by us. The district court was not bound to surrender its jurisdiction until a case was made which on the face of the record showed that the petitioners were in law entitled to a removal. The mere filing of a petition is not enough unless, when taken in connection with the rest of the record, it shows on its face that the petitioner has, under the statute, the right to take the suit to another tribunal. Railroad Co. v. Koontz, 104 U. S. 14.

The act of 1875, c. 137, § 3, 18 Stat. 470, which governs this case, provides that the petition for removal must be filed at or before the term at which the cause could be first tried, and before the trial. This has been construed to mean the first term at which the cause is in law triable -- the first term in which the cause would stand for trial if the parties had taken the usual steps as to pleadings and other preparations. Babbitt v. Clark, 103 U. S. 606; Pullman Palace Car Co. v. Speck, 113 U. S. 87. It has also been decided that there cannot be a removal after a hearing on a demurrer to a complaint because it does not state facts sufficient to constitute a cause of action. Alley v. Nott, 111 U. S. 472; Scharff v. Levy, 112 U. S. 711. Either one of these rules is fatal to the present case. If we treat the suit as originally one to enforce the liens of Hartley and Tingley upon the property as security for the payment of the amounts due them respectively, it was begun when their respective answers and cross-petitions claiming affirmative relief were filed, and this was certainly not later than December 13, 1880, or a year and a half before the petition for removal was presented. Five terms of the court had passed at either one of which the case would have been triable if the parties had taken the usual steps as to pleadings and preparations. In fact, more than a year had elapsed from the time the issues had actually been made up on the pleadings of some of the parties.

Then again, the answers and cross-petitions of the claimants of these several liens are to be treated as their petitions for relief upon their respective causes of action. The answer and cross-petition of Hartley, the original answer of Tingley, and the original answer and cross-petition of Parshall were all demurred to on the 17th of May, 1880, and the demurrers overruled, nearly two years before the petition for removal was filed. After the hearing on the demurrers, it was too late, under our decisions, to ask for a removal.

Without considering any of the other objections to the removal which might be urged, the judgment was Affirmed.

== See also ==
- List of United States Supreme Court cases, volume 113
