= Flagg v. Walker =

- Supreme Court of the United States

Argued January 16, 1885 Decided March 2, 1885
- Full case name: Flagg v. Walker
- Citations: 113 U.S. 659 (more) 5 S. Ct. 697; 28 L. Ed. 1072

Court membership
- Chief Justice Morrison Waite Associate Justices Samuel F. Miller · Stephen J. Field; Joseph P. Bradley · John M. Harlan; William B. Woods · Stanley Matthews; Horace Gray · Samuel Blatchford

Case opinion
- Majority: Woods, joined by unanimous

Flagg v. Walker, 113 U.S. 659 (1885), regards a case where the deeds for several parcels of land were transferred from Flagg, who was in financial difficulty, to Walker in return for paying off Flagg's debts and profits from the sale against a mortgage for other property owned by Flagg.

== Flagg's financial situation ==
William F. Flagg, one of the appellants, was the owner, in February 1875, of real estate in and near the City of Bloomington, Illinois, which may be generally described as follows:

1. A large manufacturing establishment, known as the Empire Machine Works, and about 3 acres (12,000 m^{2}) of land upon which it stood.
2. A tract of land containing about 69 acres (280,000 m^{2}), known as "the pasture", situated in the northeastern part of the city.
3. Block No. 1, in Flagg's third addition to the City of Bloomington, containing about 5 acres (20,000 m^{2}), on which stood his residence. This property is designated in the record as the "homestead".
4. A large number of lots in the city, most of them vacant, but on about ten of which were tenement houses.
5. A tract in Fayette County, Illinois, and lands in Pettis County, Missouri. He also owned a large amount of personal property, consisting mainly of the machinery and tools in the Empire Machine Works.

At the time, Flagg was in financial difficulty in his business and owed over $50,000. The larger part of this indebtedness bore interest at the rate of ten percent per annum. Much of the real estate was covered by mortgages; his tenement houses were out of repair; he was largely in arrears for taxes and for interest on his indebtedness, and was in broken health. In this condition of his affairs, he sent for the appellee, Samuel Walker, who resided in Massachusetts, and who was the brother of his first wife, and made a statement to him of his financial condition.

== Walker funding ==
Walker, upon the transfer of the property, paid off all or nearly all of the unsecured debts of Flagg, and furnished Mrs. Flagg with money to pay the taxes which were due and interest due and unpaid on the residue of Flagg's debts, and supplied Flagg with money to take a trip for the improvement of his health. The money so advanced amounted on August 27, 1875, to over $11,000.

After these events, on September 25, 1878, the original bill in this case was filed by Mrs. Flagg against Walker, Sibley, Weed, the trustee, and her husband, William F. Flagg. It alleged that since the conveyances made by her husband to Walker in February 1875, the former had by mesne conveyances transferred and conveyed to her "all his interest, right, and title in and to said real estate above mentioned," referring to the real estate conveyed by Flagg to Walker, "and all personal property appertaining thereto, or that went into the hands of Samuel Walker." The bill set out the transfer to Walker by Flagg and his wife of the real and personal estate of Flagg, and in reference thereto made the following averments: "That the said deeds were intended by said William F. Flagg and oratrix to secure the said Samuel Walker for his advances to be made by him, as above set forth, and as a further security for a reasonable compensation to be paid to him for the rendition of such services, and that he might out of the sale of a portion of said property be reimbursed for such advances and compensation. It was also agreed . . . that when the purpose for which such conveyance had been made was fully completed, the said Samuel Walker was to reconvey to William F. Flagg, or to oratrix, as they might elect at least one-half of the property remaining unsold and undisposed of, and should keep for himself and for his compensation a portion of said lands, not exceeding one-half of the residue, after payment of all debts."

== Dispute ==
The bill also averred "that shortly after receiving the said deeds of conveyance Samuel Walker executed a statement in writing in which he set forth and stated to your oratrix the use and purpose, both set forth, upon which the said Samuel Walker had received the said property in trust." The bill charged "that said deeds of conveyance made to Samuel Walker, while, in fact warranty deeds," were "in equity no more or less than mortgages, made to secure said Samuel Walker for his advances to be made by him, and said advances were to be sufficient in amount to pay all indebtedness of said William F. Flagg to other persons than said Samuel Walker, and that said Samuel Walker was to reimburse himself out of the sales to be made by him. " The bill alleged that Walker neglected and refused to furnish money to pay the interest on the debt to Sibley, secured by the trust deed to Weed on "the pasture," which was well worth $80,000, and that had it not been for the conveyance thereof by Flagg to Walker, Flagg would have been able to raise money to pay the interest on the debt as it accrued, or could have made a new loan and paid off Sibley's claim in full, but by reason of the conveyance to Walker, he was unable to do so, and that Walker knowingly and willfully permitted Sibley, by Weed, his trustee, to sell the premises at a forced sale for about $10,000, when its real value at the time of the sale, was $80,000.

Walker filed his answer alleging that he came to Illinois at the request of Flagg and his wife, and upon examination of Flagg's affairs found that he was deeply in debt; that his real estate was heavily encumbered, and that he owed a large floating debt and was out of funds, and that all of his property was likely to be taken from him if it should be forced to sale, but that, after a full investigation, he became satisfied that Flagg's property, with good management, was worth more than his indebtedness, and that he proposed that Flagg should convey all his property to him, and let him manage his business for him; that Walker agreed that he would take the property without any future right of control, management, or ownership remaining in Flagg, and would pay off the debts of Flagg specified in a list furnished to him by Flagg.

This list did not include the debt due to Sibley, and he refused to assume that debt and would not agree to pay it, but promised that he would use the rents and profits of the land toward keeping down the interest on the Sibley debt and the taxes, and if he could sell the property so as to pay the debt, he would do so, or he would convey the same to any parties to whom Flagg might sell.

At the time of this case, Walker agreed to pay off all the ascertained indebtedness of Flagg, except the Sibley debt, and as to that he was only to pay so much of it as could be made out of a sale of the lands mortgaged to secure it. Walker did in fact pay off all the other indebtedness of Flagg. The complaint made against him is that he did not furnish money to pay the Sibley debt, or sufficient to keep down the interest, but made default in the payment of interest, and thus allowed the property to be sacrificed at a forced sale.

In view of the declaration of trust made by Walker on April 12, 1875, it is clear that the transaction between Flagg and Walker was not a mortgage

== Court ruling ==
The Supreme Court found no error in the proceedings and decree of the circuit court. But as the time limited by the decree, to-wit, April 1, 1881, for the payment to Walker by W. F. Flagg, or some one of the defendants to the cross-bill, of the said sum of $25,207.18, with interest, has passed, we think the time for such payment should be extended. The appellants, while they were litigating their rights with Walker in this Court, having given an appeal bond, which superseded the decree of the circuit court, were not required to make the payment.

The court directed that the decree of the circuit court be so modified as to extend the time for the payment of the sum coming to Walker for the period of six months from the filing of the mandate of this Court in the circuit court, and, as so modified, the decree of the circuit was affirmed.

== See also ==
- List of United States Supreme Court cases, volume 113
