= Blake v. City and County of San Francisco =

- Supreme Court of the United States

Argued January 30, 1885 Decided March 2, 1885
- Full case name: Flagg v. Walker
- Citations: 113 U.S. 679 (more) 5 S. Ct. 692; 28 L. Ed. 1070

Court membership
- Chief Justice Morrison Waite Associate Justices Samuel F. Miller · Stephen J. Field; Joseph P. Bradley · John M. Harlan; William B. Woods · Stanley Matthews; Horace Gray · Samuel Blatchford

Case opinion
- Majority: Woods, joined by unanimous

Blake v. City and County of San Francisco, 113 U.S. 679 (1885), was an appeal from a decree that dismissed a bill filed by the appellant to restrain the infringement by the appellees of reissued letters patent granted to the appellant as the assignee of original letters patent issued to Thomas H. Bailey. The original patent was dated February 9, 1864, and the reissue September 18, 1877. They were for "a new and improved valve for water cylinders of steam fire engines and other pump cylinders." The specification, which was substantially the same in both patents, stated that previous to the invention therein described, the only valve used to relieve the pressure upon fire hose to prevent them from bursting was one operated by hand. To obviate the defects of such a valve, the inventor applied at some point between the engine or pump and the hose nozzle a valve which opened automatically by the pressure in the hose or the pump cylinder, so as to discharge an additional stream and thereby relieve the pressure.

== Background ==
The reissued patent contains two claims, the second of which only is found in the original. They were as follows:

1. The combination, with a pump cylinder and hose of a fire engine, of an automatic relief valve arranged relatively thereto substantially as specified.
2. The combination of the value C, stem d', spring E, adjustable cap D, and pin-hole d whereby the valve may be either held upon its seat with a variable yielding pressure or may be elevated therefrom or held immovably thereon, as an ordinary screw plug.
3. The answer of the defendants denied infringement, denied that Bailey was the original inventor of the devices described in his patent, and averred that his alleged invention had been in notorious public use many years before the application of a patent therefor by Bailey.

The appellant did not contend that the appellees infringe the first claim of the reissued patent. He based his demand for relief on the alleged infringement of the second claim only.

The proper construction of this claim was that it covered an automatic valve in combination with a contrivance consisting of a pinhole and pin, by which the valve may be raised from its seat, so as to leave the valve hole permanently open, or by which the valve may be rigidly closed upon its seat, making a closed or plug valve.

The evidence showed that Bailey was not the first to conceive the idea of a device for opening or closing rigidly an automatic valve. The same thing had been done by means of wedges and screws and other devices. He cannot therefore cover by his patent all the devices for producing this result, no matter what their form or mode of operation. The claim must be confined to the specific device described in the specification and claim—namely a pinhole and pin. If this construction of the claim be adopted, it is clear that no infringement is shown, for the appellees do not use a pinhole and pin for holding their valve open or closed, but a screw, sleeve, or cap, and therefore one of the elements of the combination, covered by the second claim of appellant's patent, is wanting in the device used by the appellees.

But if it be contended that the device covered by the second claim of the appellant's patent is infringed simply by the use of an automatic relief valve which can be converted at will into an open or closed valve, the evidence in the record is abundant.

== Decision ==
Upon this state of facts, it was plain that the mere employment by the defendants of the old and well known automatic safety valve afforded no ground upon which to base the relief prayed for in the appellant's bill. Appellant's counsel therefore disclaimed any right to the exclusive use of an automatic safety valve, and said: "We do not claim the valve any further than in this combination with a steam fire engine."

If it be conceded, therefore, that the second claim of appellant's patent covered the use of an automatic relief valve applied to a steam fire engine and hose, the question is presented whether the appellant's patent thus construed is valid.

Justice Horace Gray speaking for the court;

"It is settled by many decisions of this Court . . . that the application of an old process or machine to a similar or analogous subject, with no change in the manner of application, and no result substantially distinct in its nature, will not sustain a patent, even if the new form of result has not before been contemplated."

It follows from this principle that where the public has acquired in any way the right to use a machine or device for a particular purpose, it has the right to use it for all the like purposes to which it can be applied, and no one can take out a patent to cover the application of the device to a similar purpose.

If there is any qualification of this rule, it is that if a new and different result is obtained by a new application of an invention, such new application may be patented as an improvement on the original invention, but if the result claimed as new is the same in character as the original result, it will not be deemed a new result for this purpose. For instance, an automatic relief valve, used to relieve the pressure of steam, produces no new result in character when used to relieve the pressure of water unless some further effect besides the mere relief of pressure is obtained. This qualification therefore will not affect the present case, because no new result in character is accomplished by the supposed invention of the plaintiff. Besides, it appears from the evidence that before Bailey's patent was applied for, relief valves were in common use, both on land and at sea. They were commonly used on the steam feed pumps of steamships. These pumps were usually fitted with nozzles for the attachment of hose, so that the feed pump could, in case of need, be used as a steam fire engine. It is therefore plain that in this state of the art, Bailey could not obtain a valid patent for applying a similar valve to a portable steam fire engine. He could not do this for two reasons: first, because the public had the right to use the valve for all similar purposes for which it was adapted, and second because the application of a valve, which had been used on a stationary steam fire engine on ships, to a portable steam fire engine on land, did not require any ingenuity, or involve invention.

It is no answer to this to assert that the application of a relief valve to a portable steam fire engine is the invention of a new combination. There was no invention. The combination was already in public use on steamships. The application of the valve to a similar use on land was not a new combination or a new invention.

We are of opinion, therefore, that, construing his patent as the appellant has been compelled by the testimony to do, Bailey invented nothing but the pinhole and pin mentioned in his specification, and this is not used by the appellees.

The decree of the circuit court was affirmed.

== See also ==
- List of United States Supreme Court cases, volume 113
