= Maxwell's Executors v. Wilkinson =

- Supreme Court of the United States

Argued January 28, 1885 Decided March 2, 1885
- Full case name: Maxwell's Executors v. Wilkinson
- Citations: 113 U.S. 656 (more) 5 S. Ct. 691; 28 L. Ed. 1037

Court membership
- Chief Justice Morrison Waite Associate Justices Samuel F. Miller · Stephen J. Field; Joseph P. Bradley · John M. Harlan; William B. Woods · Stanley Matthews; Horace Gray · Samuel Blatchford

Case opinion
- Majority: Gray, joined by unanimous

Maxwell's Executors v. Wilkinson, 113 U.S. 656 (1885), was a writ of error brought by the executors of a former collector of the port of New York to reverse a judgment in an action brought against him by the defendant in error to recover duties paid by them on imported iron.

Justice Gray delivered the opinion of the Court:

The witness, according to his own testimony, had no recollection, either independently of the memoranda or assisted by them, that he had filed a protest with the collector; did not know when he made the memorandum in pencil; made the memorandum in ink twenty months after the transaction from the memorandum in pencil and probably other memoranda, since destroyed and not produced nor their contents proved, and his testimony that he did file the protest was based exclusively upon his having signed a statement to that effect twenty months afterwards and upon his habit never to sign a statement unless it was true. Memoranda are not competent evidence by reason of having been made in the regular course of business unless contemporaneous with the transaction to which they relate. 21 U. S. 337; 76 U. S. 14 Wall. 375; Chaffee v. United States, 18 Wall. 516.

It is well settled that memoranda are inadmissible to refresh the memory of a witness unless reduced to writing at or shortly after the time of the transaction and while it must have been fresh in his memory. The memorandum must have been "presently committed to writing," Lord Holt in Sandwell v. Sandwell, Comb. 445; S.C. Holt, 295; "while the occurrences mentioned in it were recent, and fresh in his recollection," Lord Ellenborough in Burrough v. Martin, 2 Camp. 112; "written contemporaneously with the transaction," Chief Justice Tindal in Steinkeller v. Newton, 9 Car. & P. 313; or "contemporaneously or nearly so with the facts deposed to," Chief Justice Wilde (afterwards Lord Chancellor Truro) in Whitfield v. Aland, 2 Car. & K. 1015. See also Burton v. Plummer, 2 Ad. & El. 341; S.C. 4 Nev. & Man. 315; Wood v. Cooper, 1 Car. & K. 645; Morrison v. Chapin, 97 Mass. 72, 77; Spring Garden Ins. Co. v. Evans, 15 Md. 54.

The reasons for limiting the time within which the memorandum must have been made are, to say the least, quite as strong when the witness, after reading it, has no recollection of the facts stated in it, but testifies to the truth of those facts only because of his confidence that he must have known them to be true when he signed the memorandum. Halsey v. Sinsebaugh, 15 N.Y. 485; Marely v. Shults, 29 N.Y. 346, 355; State v. Rawls, 2 Nott & McCord 331; O'Neale v. Walton, 1 Rich. 234.

In any view of the case, therefore, the copy of the protest was erroneously admitted because the memorandum in ink, which was the only one on which the witness relied, was made long after the transaction which it purported to state, and its admission requires that the judgment be reversed, and a new trial ordered.

== See also ==
- List of United States Supreme Court cases, volume 113
