= Chase v. Curtis =

- Supreme Court of the United States

Argued January 30, 1885 Decided March 2, 1885
- Full case name: Chase v. Curtis
- Citations: 113 U.S. 452 (more) 5 S. Ct. 554; 28 L. Ed. 1038

Court membership
- Chief Justice Morrison Waite Associate Justices Samuel F. Miller · Stephen J. Field; Joseph P. Bradley · John M. Harlan; William B. Woods · Stanley Matthews; Horace Gray · Samuel Blatchford

Case opinion
- Majority: Matthews, joined by unanimous

Chase v. Curtis, 113 U.S. 452 (1885), was a suit brought under the provisions of §12 of the Act of the Legislature of New York of February 17, 1848, as amended June 7, 1875, where trustees of corporations formed for manufacturing, mining, mechanical, or chemical purposes are made liable for debts of the company on failure to file the reports of capital and of debts required by that section, is penal in its character, and must be construed with strictness as against those sought to be subjected to its liabilities. Suit was brought to recover from the trustees of such a corporation the amount of a judgment against the corporation, the judgment roll is not competent evidence to establish a debt due from the corporation to the plaintiff.

A claim in tort against a corporation formed under that act, as amended, is not a debt of the company for which the trustees may become liable jointly and severally under the provisions of the Act. In a proceeding to enforce a liability created by a state statute, the courts of the United States give to a judgment of a state court the same effect, either as evidence or as cause of action, which is given to it in like proceedings in the courts of the state whose laws are invoked in the enforcement.

The complaint in this action, after alleging that the plaintiff in error was a citizen of Pennsylvania, and the defendants citizens of New York, proceeded as follows:

- "Second. That at the times hereinafter mentioned, the defendants were trustees of the Union Petroleum Company of New York."
- "Third. That the said company is, and at the times hereinafter mentioned was, a corporation organized pursuant to an Act of the legislature of the State of New York entitled 'An act to authorize the formation of corporations for manufacturing, mining, mechanical, or chemical purposes,' passed on the 17th day of February, 1848, and the amendments thereto, its principal place of business being in the City of New York."
- "Fourth. That the said plaintiffs brought their plea of trespass on the case against the said Union Petroleum Company of New York in the Court of Common Pleas for the County of Venango, in the State of Pennsylvania, in which the said Union Petroleum Company duly appeared, and that the said action was thereafter, and on or about the 9th day of September, 1873, on the petition of the said Union Petroleum Company, verified by the affidavit of Abijah Curtis, one of the defendants above named, removed to the United States Circuit Court for the Western District of Pennsylvania. And that on the 30th day of July, 1874, and before the time for filing the annual report hereinafter mentioned, the above-named plaintiffs duly recovered a judgment in the said action against the said Union Petroleum Company of New York in the Circuit Court of the United States in and for the Western District of Pennsylvania, by the judgment and consideration of said court having jurisdiction therein, and of the said Union Petroleum Company of New York, for forty thousand five hundred dollars ($40,500.00) damages, and three hundred and twenty-eight dollars and ninety-seven cents ($328.97) costs, which judgment was duly given, and still remains in full force and effect, not satisfied or annulled, and no part thereof has been paid."
- "Fifth. That the said Union Petroleum Company of New York did not within twenty (20) days from the first day of January, 1875, make and publish a report as required by law in such case made and provided, signed by its president and a majority of its trustees, and verified by the oaths of the president or secretary thereof, and did not file the same in the office of the clerk of the county where the business of the company was carried on, to-wit, the County of New York, nor have they made, published, signed, verified, or filed any such report whatsoever as by law required, but have wholly failed so to do."

"Wherefore the plaintiffs demand judgment against the above-named defendants in the sum of $40,828.97, with interest on $40,500.00 from the 30th day of July, 1874, and on $328.97 from the 3d day of October, 1874, besides the costs and disbursements of this action."

To this complaint the defendants severally demurred on the ground that it did not state facts sufficient to constitute a cause of action. The demurrer was sustained and judgment rendered in favor of the defendants dismissing the complaint, to reverse which this writ of error is prosecuted.

The statute on which the action is founded is as follows:

"SECTION 1. The twelfth section of the 'Act to authorize the formation of corporations for manufacturing, mining, mechanical, or chemical purposes,' passed February 17, 1848, as said section was amended by chapter 657 of the Laws of 1871, is hereby further amended, so that section 12 shall read as follows:"

"§ 12. Every such company shall, within twenty days from the first day of January, if a year from the time of the filing of the certificate of incorporation shall then have expired, and if so long a time shall not have expired, then within twenty days from the first day of January in each year after the expiration of a year from the time of filing such certificate, make a report, which shall be published in some newspaper published in the town, city, or village, or, if there be no newspaper published in said town, city, or village, then in some newspaper published nearest the place where the business of the company is carried on, which shall state the amount of capital, and of the proportion actually paid in, and the amount of its existing debts, which report shall be signed by the president and a majority of the trustees, and shall be verified by the oath of the president or secretary of said company, and filed in the office of the clerk of the county where the business of the company shall be carried on, and if any of said companies shall fail so to do, all the trustees of the company shall be jointly and severally liable for all the debts of the company then existing, and for all that shall be contracted before such report shall be made. But whenever under this section a judgment shall be recovered against a trustee severally, all the trustees of the company shall contribute a ratable share of the amount paid by such trustee on such judgment, and such trustee shall have a right of action against his co-trustees, jointly or severally, to recover from them their proportion of the amount so paid on such judgment, provided that nothing in this act contained shall affect any action now pending.

It is finally insisted that a judgment against the corporation, although founded upon a tort, becomes ipso facto a debt by contract, being a contract of record or a specialty in the nature of a contract. But we have already seen that the settled course of decision in the New York Court of Appeals rejects the judgment against the corporation as either evidence or ground of liability against the trustees, and founds the latter upon the obligation of the corporation on which the judgment itself rests. And it was decided by this Court in the case of Louisiana v. New Orleans, 109 U. S. 285, that a liability for a tort, created by statute, although reduced to judgment by a recovery for the damages suffered, did not thereby become a debt by contract in the sense of the Constitution of the United States forbidding state legislation impairing its obligation, for the reason that the term 'contract' is used in the Constitution in its ordinary sense as signifying the agreement of two or more minds, for considerations proceeding from one to the other, to do or not to do certain acts. Mutual assent to its terms is of its very essence."

The same definition applies in the present instance, and excludes the liability of the defendants, as trustees of the corporation, for its torts, although reduced to judgment.

The court found no error in the judgment of the circuit court, and it was accordingly affirmed.

== See also ==
- List of United States Supreme Court cases, volume 113
