= Thornley v. United States =

- Supreme Court of the United States

Argued January 13, 1885 Decided February 2, 1885
- Full case name: Thornley v. United States
- Citations: 113 U.S. 310 (more) 5 S. Ct. 491; 28 L. Ed. 999

Court membership
- Chief Justice Morrison Waite Associate Justices Samuel F. Miller · Stephen J. Field; Joseph P. Bradley · John M. Harlan; William B. Woods · Stanley Matthews; Horace Gray · Samuel Blatchford

Case opinion
- Majority: Miller, joined by unanimous

Thornley v. United States, 113 U.S. 310 (1885), was a lawsuit brought against the United States to recover the balance due on pay to the appellant who had been an officer of the U.S. Navy.

== Facts ==
The appellant alleged that on September 1, 1855, he was commissioned a surgeon in the navy; that on June 1, 1861, while he still held the grade or rank of surgeon, he was, by order of the Secretary of the Navy, issued by direction of the President, placed on the retired list, in accordance with the provisions of an Act of Congress approved February 21, 1861, 12 Stat. 150, by reason of incapacity for further service at sea, but that for some years after said retirement, he was assigned to and performed active duty; that by § 3 of the Act of Congress approved July 15, 1870, the sea pay of an officer on the active list of the navy of the grade or rank held by the appellant at the time of his retirement was fixed, for the first five years from date of commission at $2,800 per annum; for the second five years from the date of commission at $3,200 per annum; for the third five years from the date of commission at $3,500 per annum; for the fourth five years from the date of commission at $3,700 per annum, and after twenty years from the date of commission at $4,200 per annum.

The petition further alleged that an Act of Congress approved March 3, 1873, 17 Stat. 247, fixed the pay of officers of the navy, who were then or might thereafter be retired on account of incapacity, resulting from sickness or exposure in the line of duty at 75 percent of the sea pay of the grade or rank which they held at the time of their retirement; that the Act of Congress approved April 7, 1882, 22 Stat. 41, entitled "An act for the relief of Medical Director John Thornley, United States navy," the appellant, directed that he be considered as having been retired from active service as a surgeon and placed on the retired list of officers of the navy, June 1, 1861, on account of physical incapacity originating in the line of duty, and that he be paid accordingly.

These sections have been reproduced in the Revised Statutes, and read as follows, respectively:

SEC. 1556. The commissioned officers and warrant officers on the active list of the Navy of the United States, and the petty officers, seamen, ordinary seamen, firemen, coal-heavers, and employees, in the navy, shall be entitled to receive annual pay at the rates hereinafter stated, after their respective designations: the admiral, thirteen thousand dollars; . . . surgeons, paymasters, and chief engineers, who have the same rank with paymasters during the first five years after date of commission, when at sea, two thousand eight hundred dollars; on shore duty, two thousand four hundred dollars; on leave or waiting orders, two thousand dollars; during the second five years after such date, when at sea, three thousand two hundred dollars; on shore duty, two thousand eight hundred dollars; on leave or waiting orders, two thousand four hundred dollars; during the third five years after such date, when at sea, three thousand five hundred dollars; on shore duty, three thousand two hundred dollars; on leave or waiting orders, two thousand six hundred dollars; during the fourth five years after such date, when at sea, three thousand seven hundred dollars; on shore duty, three thousand six hundred dollars; on leave or waiting orders, two thousand eight hundred dollars; after twenty years from such date, when at sea, four thousand two hundred dollars; on shore duty, four thousand dollars; on leave or waiting orders, three thousand dollars.

SEC. 1588. The pay of all officers of the navy who have been retired after forty-five years' service after reaching the age of sixteen years, or who have been or may be retired after forty years' service, upon their own application to the President, or on attaining the age of sixty-two years, or on account of incapacity resulting from long and faithful service, from wounds or injuries received in the line of duty, or from sickness or exposure therein, shall, when not on active duty, be equal to seventy-five percent of the sea pay provided by this chapter for the grade or rank which they held, respectively at the time of their retirement. The pay of all other officers on the retired list shall, when not on active duty, be equal to one-half the sea pay provided by this chapter for the grade or rank held by them, respectively at the time of their retirement.

The Act also provided that no officer on the retired list of the navy should be employed on active duty except in time of war.

The contention of the appellant is that upon these enactments he is entitled to what is known as "longevity pay." The contention of the United States is that longevity pay is only given to officers on the active list of the navy, and not to retired officers, to which latter class the appellant belongs.

The statute allowing longevity pay to officers of the army, § 1262, Rev.Stat., declared that there should be allowed and paid to all officers below the rank of brigadier general ten percent of their current yearly pay for every term of five years' service, but it did not restrict the increased pay to officers in active service. The point on which the case turned was the decision of the court, that an officer of the army, though retired, was still in the service, and he was included in the very terms of the statute allowing the increased pay. The statute on which the appellant relies excludes him, by its terms, from its benefits.

== Decision ==
The court was not called on to explain why the US Congress should apply one rule to the officers of the army and another to the officers of the navy. It is sufficient to say that it has clearly done so. If the law is unequal and unjust, the remedy is with Congress and not with the courts.

The judgment was affirmed.

== See also ==
- List of United States Supreme Court cases, volume 113
