= Camp v. United States =

- Supreme Court of the United States

Argued January 27–28, 1885 Decided March 2, 1885
- Full case name: Camp v. United States
- Citations: 113 U.S. 648 (more) 5 S. Ct. 687; 28 L. Ed. 1081

Court membership
- Chief Justice Morrison Waite Associate Justices Samuel F. Miller · Stephen J. Field; Joseph P. Bradley · John M. Harlan; William B. Woods · Stanley Matthews; Horace Gray · Samuel Blatchford

Case opinion
- Majority: Harlan, joined by unanimous

Camp v. United States, 113 U.S. 648 (1885), was an action brought by the appellant on April 13, 1869, to recover a balance alleged to be due as compensation for collecting and delivering to the United States a large amount of cotton in bales which was captured and abandoned property within the meaning of the acts of Congress. He claimed to have performed the services in question under an arrangement or agreement with an agent of the US Treasury Department which the Secretary of the Treasury subsequently recognized as a valid contract with the government. He admits certain payments on his claim, and asks judgment for the further sum of $80,000. The court below dismissed his petition.

== Background ==
The precise form in which appellant's claim for compensation was presented at the Treasury Department is not shown by the findings of fact. The orders given in 1865 by the assistant Secretary for the statement of an account and a requisition in favor of the claimant discloses the fact that Camp had collected the cotton "for an interest therein," and that the payment of $30,000 was intended as an advance to him on account of his expenditures in relation to the cotton, while the payment of $15,000 to Smith was "on account of his joint interest with Camp in said cotton." But this falls far short of an agreement by the department to make further payment.

These facts, at most, imply necessarily nothing more than that the department was willing under the circumstances to compensate him to the extent of the foregoing sums. Whether he should receive any compensation or how much should be awarded him were matters which depended, as we have seen, upon the discretion of the Secretary of the Treasury. No one acting by his authority had bound the government to make compensation. If the Secretary refused to pay anything, the claimant had no remedy except to apply to Congress for a special appropriation in his behalf. The mere payment of $45,000 on a claim for a much larger sum as compensation for services rendered in delivering captured or abandoned property to the government—for which services it was under no legal obligation, express or implied, to make compensation—cannot be deemed a recognition of a legal liability to make further payments on such claim. We find in the record no evidence of any purpose or agreement upon the part of the Secretary of the Treasury to make compensation to claimant beyond that already allowed, and to say that the court may award such compensation as it deems just and proper is to impose upon the government the obligations of a contract in respect of captured or abandoned property which, under the acts of Congress, only the Secretary of the Treasury or such agents of the department as he designated for that purpose had authority to make.

== Judgment ==
These views made it unnecessary to consider other questions argued by counsel, and lead to an affirmance of the judgment.

== See also ==
- List of United States Supreme Court cases, volume 113
