= Chicago & Northwestern Railway Co. v. Crane =

Chicago & Northwestern R. Co. v. Crane
- Supreme Court of the United States

Argued January 20, 1885 Decided March 2, 1885
- Full case name: Chicago & Northwestern R. Co. v. Crane
- Citations: 113 U.S. 424 (more) 5 S. Ct. 578; 28 L. Ed. 1064

Court membership
- Chief Justice Morrison Waite Associate Justices Samuel F. Miller · Stephen J. Field; Joseph P. Bradley · John M. Harlan; William B. Woods · Stanley Matthews; Horace Gray · Samuel Blatchford

Case opinion
- Majority: Matthews, joined by unanimous

Chicago & Northwestern R. Co. v. Crane, 113 U.S. 424 (1885), was a suit brought by a taxpayer and resident in the Town of Polk City, Iowa, on behalf of himself and all other resident voters, taxpayers and property holders, commenced suit in a state court of Iowa against two companies, praying for a peremptory writ of mandamus to compel the reconstruction and operation of the old line after the Chicago and North Western Railway, an Illinois corporation. changed the line and made it avoid the city, constructing a branch to the latter. C&NW Railway was leased the line by the D&M Railroad Company, an Iowa Corporation, who had received from a township in Iowa, in consideration of its agreement to construct and maintain a railroad to a city in the township, the proceeds of a special tax and a conveyance of a large amount of swamp lands. It constructed the railroad and operating it for a time before leasing it to C&N Railway.

The Chicago and Northwestern Railway Company filed its petition for a removal of the cause to the circuit court of the United States. After setting out that the matter and amount in dispute, exclusive of costs, exceeds the sum or value of $500 and that the petitioner is a corporation and citizen of Illinois.

Justice Matthews delivered the opinion of the Court. He recited the facts as stated above and continued:

The right of removal from the state court which is contested in this case is founded on the last clause of the second section of the Act of March 3, 1875, 18 Stat. 470, Richardson's Supplement 173:

"And when in any suit mentioned in this section there shall be a controversy which is wholly between citizens of different states, and which can be fully determined as between them, then either one or more of the plaintiffs or defendants actually interested in such controversy may remove said suit into the Circuit Court of the United States for the proper district."

It is accordingly argued in its support that the sole and real controversy disclosed by the pleadings is between the plaintiff below and the plaintiff in error, to which the Des Moines and Minneapolis Railroad Company is a merely nominal party. The action, it is said, is brought in pursuance of § 3373 of the Iowa Code, which is as follows:

"The action of mandamus is one brought in a court of competent jurisdiction to obtain an order of such court commanding an inferior tribunal, board, corporation, or person to do or not to do an act, the performance or omission of which the law enjoins as a duty resulting from an office, trust, or station."

And by § 3379 it is further provided that

"The pleadings and other proceedings in any action in which a mandamus is claimed shall be the same in all respects as nearly as may be, and costs shall be recovered by either party as in an ordinary action for the recovery of damages. "

It is also declared in § 3375 that

"The plaintiff in any action, except those brought for the recovery of specific, real, or personal property, may also, as an auxiliary relief, have an order of mandamus to compel the performance of a duty established in such action. But if such duty the performance of which is sought to be compelled is not one resulting from an office, trust, or station, it must be one for the breach of which a legal right to damages is already complete at the commencement of the action, and must also be a duty of which a court of equity would enforce the performance."

The proposition that the Des Moines and Minneapolis Railroad Company is a merely nominal and not a real and substantial party to the controversy is maintained on two grounds, (1) that the relief sought against it rests upon the force of the alleged agreements in reference to the location of its line, which constitute the conditions of the taxes voted, lands granted, and stock subscriptions paid to it, and that mandamus will not lie for the purpose of enforcing the specific performance of personal contracts, (2) and that the Des Moines and Minneapolis Railroad Company is not only exonerated but disabled from the performance of the duty sought to be enforced against it, if for such it were amenable to the process of mandamus, by virtue of the lease of its road, property, and franchises to the plaintiff in error, that lease being authorized by § 1300 of the Code of Iowa, as follows:

"Any such corporation may sell or lease its railway property and franchises, or make joint running arrangements with any corporation owning or operating any connecting railway, and the corporation operating the railway of another shall in all respects be liable in the same manner and extent as though such railway belonged to it, subject to the laws of this state."

But to sustain the first point it is necessary to decide the controversy in favor of the Des Moines and Minneapolis Railroad Company, one of the defendants sought to be charged, upon its merits. That necessarily affirms that such a controversy exists, and that, in its turn, proves that the circuit court did not err in holding that it had no jurisdiction to entertain it.

It may be a question whether the remedy by mandamus is not larger and more extensive under the Iowa Code than the plaintiff in error admits. And at any rate, we cannot strike from the record parts of the plaintiff's case as immaterial without assuming the point to be proved that we have a right to consider its merits at all, for whether they are material may be the substance of the controversy. It may well be that the scope of the plaintiff's case includes the claim that the railway company, having, on the faith of the alleged agreements, made a location of its line, exhausted its corporate power in reference to its establishment, or that even if it still had corporate discretion to change it, the circumstances alleged, including the agreements made on condition of its original location, may not have created a corporate duty, enforceable by mandamus, to maintain and permanently operate it. These are questions certainly which the plaintiff in the action has the right to raise and have tried in any court of his own selection having proper jurisdiction, and they raise a controversy with the Des Moines and Minneapolis Railroad Company, to which it is a necessary party, unless it is relieved from it by the substitution in its place of its lessee by the law under which it transferred its property and franchises to the plaintiff in error.

But that section of the statute already quoted has no such effect. The court found that It does not discharge the lessor company from any of its corporate liabilities. It merely imposes a liability upon the lessee while operating it, and if this liability extends, as is claimed, to obligations of the lessor antecedent to the lease, such as that sought to be enforced in the present proceeding, there is nothing in the statute to exclude the idea that it is a joint liability, enforceable against both.

If it be said that the liability is that of the lessor, but that it is disabled by the lease from its performance, and that that duty is cast by the lease and the law upon the lessee, then the necessity for a joinder in the action is still more apparent for, to obtain a judgment against the plaintiff in error, requiring it to perform a duty devolved upon it merely because it has assumed under the law to perform the duties of another, makes it necessary, upon well settled rules of pleading, also to obtain a judgment against the latter to declare and determine with conclusive force the existence and limits of the duty to be enforced against its guarantor and substitute.

In any view we are justified in taking of the nature of the controversy disclosed by the pleadings in this proceeding, we conclude that both the original defendants are necessary parties to its determination, and that consequently the plaintiff in error was not entitled to remove the suit from the jurisdiction of the state court.

The judgment of the circuit court was accordingly affirmed.

== See also ==
- List of United States Supreme Court cases, volume 113
