= Spaids v. Cooley =

- Supreme Court of the United States

Argued January 19, 1885 Decided February 2, 1885
- Full case name: Spaids v. Cooley
- Citations: 113 U.S. 278 (more) 5 S. Ct. 449; 28 L. Ed. 984

Court membership
- Chief Justice Morrison Waite Associate Justices Samuel F. Miller · Stephen J. Field; Joseph P. Bradley · John M. Harlan; William B. Woods · Stanley Matthews; Horace Gray · Samuel Blatchford

Case opinion
- Majority: Blatchford, joined by unanimous

Spaids v. Cooley, 113 U.S. 278 (1885), was regarding a lawsuit brought to the Supreme Court of the District of Columbia in the United States on December 13, 1876, by Chauncey D. Spaids against Dennis N. Cooley to recover $593.70, with interest from July 1, 1868.

The declaration contained the common money counts and nothing more. There were two pleas, one denying indebtedness and the other averring that the alleged cause of action did not accrue within three years before the suit. The plaintiff's reply joins issue on the first plea and as to the second plea avers that the defendant promised to pay the debt named in the declaration within three years next before the commencement of the suit. At the trial, the jury found "the issue in favor of the defendant", and there was a judgment accordingly at special term. The plaintiff appealed to the general term, which affirmed the judgment, and he brought the case here by a writ of error.

It must be intended that the defendant objected to the admission of the deposition because of some alleged informality, but what that was is not set forth in connection with the objection; nor is it stated what the informality was on account of which the court ruled out the deposition. The deposition appears to be regular in form. It was taken under a commission issued by the court, and executed by the commissioner named. The interrogatories forming part of it were put and answered under a sufficient oath, administered before the answers were taken. The answers are not in narrative form, nor in the form of an affidavit, but each is an answer to the specific interrogatory of corresponding number. The place where the deposition was taken sufficiently appears. The fact that there were no cross-interrogatories cannot affect the regularity, because, under the order for the commission, made twelve days before it issued, and providing for the taking of the testimony "on the interrogatories and cross-interrogatories filed herein,"

it was for the defendant to show distinctly that there were cross-interrogatories filed which had not been annexed to the commission. In the absence of any apparent informality, if the objection made by the defendant to the admission of the deposition was made on the ground of an informality, that ground, to avail him here, should appear in the bill of exceptions, with a sufficient statement to enable this Court to see that the ground was a valid one, and the informality on which the deposition was ruled out should, to avail him, be stated in the bill of exceptions, with sufficient other matter to enable this Court to say that the identical informality on which the ruling of the court proceeded existed, and was good ground for the ruling. As the defendant made the objection to the admissibility of the deposition, and it was excluded, it was incumbent on him to make it appear, by the bill of exceptions, what the ground of objection was, and that it was a valid ground.

The evidence, in the excluded deposition, as to the new promise, was material, and ought to have been before the jury, as tending to show an absolute promise by the defendant to the plaintiff, made within three years before the bringing of the suit, to pay to the plaintiff the money in question, as money then in the hands of the defendant, and due to the plaintiff. As the direction of a verdict for the defendant appears to have been rested on the instruction that there was not sufficient evidence, to be submitted to the jury, of a new promise to take the case out of the statute of limitations, and as, if the jury had found that there was such new promise, there was evidence on both sides for the consideration of the jury on the other issues, under proper instructions, and the bills of exceptions do not purport to set out all the evidence on such other issues, a new trial must be had.

The judgment of the court in general term is reversed, and the case is remanded to that court, with a direction to reverse the judgment of the court in special term, with costs, and to direct that court to award a new trial.

== See also ==
- List of United States Supreme Court cases, volume 113
