= Drennen v. London Assurance Co. =

- Supreme Court of the United States

Submitted December 2, 1884 Decided January 5, 1885
- Full case name: Drennen v. London Assurance Co.
- Citations: 113 U.S. 51 (more) 5 S. Ct. 341; 28 L. Ed. 919

Court membership
- Chief Justice Morrison Waite Associate Justices Samuel F. Miller · Stephen J. Field; Joseph P. Bradley · John M. Harlan; William B. Woods · Stanley Matthews; Horace Gray · Samuel Blatchford

Case opinion
- Majority: Harlan, joined by unanimous

Drennen v. London Assurance Co., 113 U.S. 51 (1885), was a fire insurance case regarding two policies of fire insurance, issued March 10, 1883, by the London Assurance Corporation, of London for the property of the firm of Drennen, Starr & Everett, a business in the city of Minneapolis, Minnesota. The loss occurred on July 29, 1883.

At the ensuing trial, the amount was not disputed, but since each policy contained a provision that it should be void if the property insured "be sold or transferred, or any change takes place in title or possession, (except by succession by reason of the death of the insured,) whether by legal process, or judicial decree, or voluntary transfer or conveyance," all interest or liability on the part of the issuer would immediately terminate.'

The defendant disputed its liability on the ground that Drennen, Starr & Everett, on May 24, 1883, before the loss, admitted one Arndt as a partner in their firm, and that thereby, without its knowledge or consent, and by the voluntary act of the plaintiffs, the title, interest, and possession of the insured in the property was changed, and the policies became void.

The plaintiffs denied that Arndt became a member of their firm, and substantial proof was given that Arndt resided in Sandusky, Ohio. He visited Minneapolis in May 1883, and first became acquainted with plaintiffs Drennen and Starr on or about May 20. Negotiations then commenced with Drennen and Starr, who acted for their firm.

In the court's judgment of the agreement as a whole, the parties did not contemplate or establish a partnership. The agreement was for a corporation with all the payments and other specified items for preparation for its formation and no change in the title or possession of the property. This was sufficient to dispose of the case, reversing the decision and setting a new trial.

== See also ==
- List of United States Supreme Court cases, volume 113
