= Harvey v. United States =

- Supreme Court of the United States

Argued January 13–14, 1885 Decided February 2, 1885
- Full case name: Harvey v. United States
- Citations: 113 U.S. 243 (more) 5 S. Ct. 465; 28 L. Ed. 987

Court membership
- Chief Justice Morrison Waite Associate Justices Samuel F. Miller · Stephen J. Field; Joseph P. Bradley · John M. Harlan; William B. Woods · Stanley Matthews; Horace Gray · Samuel Blatchford

Case opinion
- Majority: Blatchford, joined by unanimous

Harvey v. United States, 113 U.S. 243 (1885), was a case for labor and materials furnished by the claimants in constructing coffer dams in Davenport, Iowa and in performing the work necessarily connected therewith and preliminary to the mason work for the piers and abutments referred to in the contract. That court proceeded on the view that the claimants had no right to rely on the testimony of experts introduced by them as to the value of the work, but should have kept and produced accounts of its cost and expense, but it gave to the claimants the benefit of the testimony of experts introduced by the United States as to such value in awarding the above amount. Held that the claimants could not be deprived of reasonable compensation for their work because they did not produce evidence of the character referred to, when it did not appear that such evidence existed, if the evidence they produced was the best evidence accessible to them and it enabled the court to arrive at a proper conclusion.

== Decision ==
The judgment of the Court of Claims is affirmed for the full amount of the award made to the claimants, and an additional amount of 842.82 is allowed for the labor done and materials furnished by the claimants in constructing coffer dams and in performing the work necessarily connected therewith and preliminary to the mason work for the piers and abutments referred to in their contract, the same being an additional allowance on account of item (1) in their petition filed August 30, 1876, and the said judgment is reversed so far as respects item (2) in that petition, and the sum of 574.80 is allowed for that item, and this cause was remanded to the Court of Claims, with a direction to enter judgment accordingly.

== See also ==
- List of United States Supreme Court cases, volume 113
