= California Artificial Stone Paving Co. v. Molitor =

- Supreme Court of the United States

Argued November 25, 1884 Decided March 2, 1885
- Full case name: California Artificial Stone Paving Co. v. Molitor
- Citations: 113 U.S. 609 (more) 5 S. Ct. 618; 28 L. Ed. 1106; 1885 U.S. LEXIS 1712

Court membership
- Chief Justice Morrison Waite Associate Justices Samuel F. Miller · Stephen J. Field; Joseph P. Bradley · John M. Harlan; William B. Woods · Stanley Matthews; Horace Gray · Samuel Blatchford

Case opinion
- Majority: Bradley, joined by unanimous

California Artificial Stone Paving Co. v. Molitor, 113 U.S. 609 (1885), involved a bill that was filed by the appellant against the appellee complaining that the latter was infringing on a letters patent granted to one John J. Schillinger, and which had been assigned for the State of California to the complainant.

The patent was for an improvement in concrete pavement was originally issued July 19, 1870, and reissued May 2, 1871. The improvement, as described in the reissued patent, consisted in laying the pavement in detached blocks separated from each other by strips of tar paper or other suitable material so as to prevent the blocks from adhering to each other. As stated in the specification:

The paper constitutes a tight waterproof joint, but it allows the several blocks to heave separately from the effects of frost or to be raised or removed separately whenever occasion may require, without injury to the adjacent blocks.

The case of Wilson v. Barnum was especially worthy of note in this connection. The question certified in that case was whether, upon the evidence given, the defendant infringed the complainant's patent. Chief Justice Taney, delivering the opinion of the Court, said:

The question thus certified is one of fact, and has been discussed as such in the arguments offered on both sides. It is a question as to the substantial identity of the two machines. . . . The jurisdiction of this Court to hear and determine a question certified from the circuit court is derived altogether from the act of 1802, and that act evidently gives the jurisdiction only in cases where the judges of the circuit court differ in opinion on a point of law. . . . In the multitude of questions which have been certified, this Court has never taken jurisdiction of a question of fact. And in a question of law it requires the precise point to be stated -- otherwise the case is remanded without an answer." The case was remanded for want of jurisdiction. It seems to us that the certificate in the present case is obnoxious to the objections presented in the cases cited. The new controversy raised by the defendant's construction of the pavement in Redwood City is substantially a new suit on the patent, and we are asked to decide it. We are asked to say whether a pavement constructed in such and such a manner is an infringement of the patent as the circuit court has construed the patent. And this is a mixed question of fact and law. By the final decree in the case, made in 1881, the court decided that the payments which the defendant had been theretofore making did infringe the patent. How those pavements were constructed we are not informed, and therefore we do not know what was the precise construction given by the court to the patent. Whether the new pavement, constructed in Redwood City, is an infringement or not, is just as much a mixed question of law and fact (as the case is presented to us) as was the question whether the pavements formerly constructed by the defendant were an infringement. It is a question which the circuit court must decide for itself in the ordinary was. If the judges disagree there can be no judgment of contempt, and the defendant must be discharged. The complainant may then either seek a review of that decision in this Court, or bring a new suit against the defendant for the alleged infringement. The latter method is by far the most appropriate one where it is really a doubtful question whether the new process adopted is an infringement or not. Process of contempt is a severe remedy, and should not be resorted to where there is fair ground of doubt as to the wrongfulness of the defendant's conduct.

The case was dismissed, with directions to the circuit court to proceed therein according to law.

== See also ==
- List of United States Supreme Court cases, volume 113
