= Hardin v. Boyd =

- Supreme Court of the United States

Submitted December 22, 1884 Decided March 15, 1885
- Full case name: Hardin, Administratrix, & Others v. Boyd, Administrator, & Others
- Citations: 113 U.S. 756 (more) 5 S. Ct. 771; 28 L. Ed. 1141

Court membership
- Chief Justice Morrison Waite Associate Justices Samuel F. Miller · Stephen J. Field; Joseph P. Bradley · John M. Harlan; William B. Woods · Stanley Matthews; Horace Gray · Samuel Blatchford

Case opinion
- Majority: Harlan, joined by unanimous

Hardin v. Boyd, 113 U.S. 756 (1885), was a motion to dismiss a lawsuit on county bonds issued in aid of a railroad. Judgment below for the plaintiff. The defendant brought a writ of error to reverse it. Subsequently, to the judgment, the county settled with the plaintiff and other bondholders, by giving them new bonds bearing a less rate of interest, and the old bonds, which were the cause of action in this suit, were surrendered and destroyed. Fraud and collusion was alleged in the handling of a will which transferred ownership of property in Crittenden County, Arkansas. These facts were brought before this Court by affidavits and transcripts from the county records, accompanied by a motion to dismiss the writ of error.

The court saw no reason to impeach the transaction by which the new bonds were substituted for the old, and for the judgment it was asked to reverse, so the writ of error was dismissed.
