= Hess v. Reynolds =

- Supreme Court of the United States

Submitted December 9, 1884 Decided January 5, 1885
- Full case name: Hess v. Reynolds
- Citations: 113 U.S. 73 (more) 5 S. Ct. 377; 28 L. Ed. 927

Holding
- The 1875 update to the removal statute only repealed and superseded statutes that were in conflict with it, so statutes that were not in conflict with it remained in force.

Court membership
- Chief Justice Morrison Waite Associate Justices Samuel F. Miller · Stephen J. Field; Joseph P. Bradley · John M. Harlan; William B. Woods · Stanley Matthews; Horace Gray · Samuel Blatchford

Case opinions
- Majority: Miller, joined by Waite, Field, Bradley, Harlan, Woods, Matthews, Blatchford
- Dissent: Gray

Hess v. Reynolds, 113 U.S. 73 (1885), was a Supreme Court case determining whether a probate case from Michigan should be moved to federal court and, if so, which federal court should hear it. The court issued a writ of error on the judgment of the Eastern District of Michigan federal court for remanding a case back to the state court and determined that was indeed the appropriate federal court to hear the case.

== Background ==
The plaintiff, a citizen of Missouri, prosecuted his claim in the probate court of Ionia County in western Michigan, against the estate of Warren Sherwood, deceased, of which William Reynolds had been appointed administrator. The claim was resisted and was referred to commissioners appointed by the probate judge, who reported against its allowance. The issue was appealed to the circuit court of Ionia County for a trial by jury and was moved to the circuit court of Jackson County in eastern Michigan after several years delay that the plaintiff believed that due to prejudice and local influence, he would not be able to obtain justice in the state court.

It was argued that the case could not be moved to federal court since the original state court had already issued its decision. It was also argued that the cause should have been moved to the circuit court for the Western District of Michigan, where the case was originally filed in Ionia County instead of the Eastern District where the case was currently pending in Jackson County.

== Decision ==
The ruling determined that since one of the parties was from a different state, that there was federal jurisdiction to hear the dispute.

The high court also found that the language of the removal statute is that suits shall be removed into the circuit court of the district where such suits are pending. Undoubtedly this means where they are pending at the time of removal. This suit was not then pending in the Western District of Michigan but in the county of Jackson, which is in the Eastern District of that state. The court’s opinion was that the case was properly removed from the circuit court of Jackson county into the circuit court of the United States for the Eastern District of Michigan and that that court erred in remanding it.

The judgment was reversed, with instructions to proceed in the case in federal court in the Eastern District according to law.
