= Provident Institution for Savings v. Mayor of Jersey City =

Provident Institution for Sav. v. Mayor of Jersey City
- Supreme Court of the United States

Submitted January 9, 1885 Decided March 2, 1885
- Full case name: Provident Institution for Savings v. Mayor & Aldermen of Jersey City
- Citations: 113 U.S. 506 (more) 5 S. Ct. 612; 28 L. Ed. 1102

Court membership
- Chief Justice Morrison Waite Associate Justices Samuel F. Miller · Stephen J. Field; Joseph P. Bradley · John M. Harlan; William B. Woods · Stanley Matthews; Horace Gray · Samuel Blatchford

Case opinion
- Majority: Bradley, joined by unanimous

Provident Institution for Savings v. Mayor of Jersey City, 113 U.S. 506 (1885), was a bill in equity filed in the Court of Chancery of New Jersey by the appellant, to foreclose two mortgages given to it on a certain lot in Jersey City, New Jersey by Michael Nugent and wife, and another person.

The first mortgage was dated January 19, 1863, to secure the payment of $900 and interest, and the second, dated July 13, 1869, to secure the payment of $700 and interest. The complainants also claimed, under the stipulations of the mortgages, the amount of certain premiums of insurance they paid. By an amended bill making the mayor and aldermen of Jersey City a defendant, the complainants alleged that the city claimed a lien on the mortgaged premises prior to that of the mortgages for certain water rents for supplying water to the occupants of the same for the year 1871, and from thence to the time of filing the bill; that this claim was made under an act of the legislature time of filing the bill; that this claim authorizing the construction of waterworks for the city, and the act revising the city charter, passed in March 1871. The bill denied the validity of this claim. It averred that those portions of the said acts which purported to give such a priority had the effect to deprive the complainant of its property in the mortgaged premises without due process of law, and were in violation of the Constitution of the United States and that of New Jersey, and the complainant prayed for a foreclosure and sale of the lot in question as against all the defendants.

There was annexed to the bill and referred to therein a copy of the "Tariff of Rates and Regulations for the Use of Passaic Water; also Rules Regulating the Plumbing of Houses and the Tapping of Sewers," being the regulations adopted by the Board of Public Works of Jersey City under the statutes referred to in the bill. The water rates specified in this tariff (except for measured water) were graduated in a table according to the width and number of stories of the houses, and were made payable annually in advance on 1 May in each year, with a penalty of three percent if not paid by the 1 July and interest at the rate of seven percent from the 20th of December. The regulations extend to many details, making provision for extra charges to certain kinds of establishments, providing penalties for misuse of the water, etc. The city authorities answered the bill, admitting that they had assessed upon the mortgaged premises the water rents set forth in the bill, and alleged that they were imposed in pursuance of an act of the Legislature of New Jersey entitled "An act to authorize the construction of works for the supplying of Jersey City and places adjacent with pure and wholesome water," approved March 25, 1852, and an act entitled "An act to reorganize the local government of Jersey City," passed March 31, 1871, and the supplements thereto, and insisted that said water rents were a lien prior to the mortgages, and prayed that it might be so adjudged.

The other defendants made no defense.

The complainant and the city authorities entered into a stipulation to the effect that the allegations of fact in the bill were to be taken as true; that in the assessment of the water rents, interest, and penalties, all the requirements of the act "to reorganize the local government of Jersey City," passed March 31, 1871, and the supplements thereto, had been complied with, and that the only question to be determined by the court was whether, upon the facts stated in the bill, the water rents and interest and penalties mentioned therein, or any of them, were liens upon the property in question prior to the lien of the complainant's mortgages.

The chancellor decided that the giving of a priority of lien to the water rents over the mortgages pursuant to the statutes did not deprive the complainant of its property without due process of law and did not otherwise conflict with the Constitution of the United States or with that of New Jersey, and he decreed that for the purpose of raising the money due on the mortgages, the mortgaged premises must be sold subject to such lien, and that the bill must be dismissed as against the city. This decree, being appealed from, was affirmed by the New Jersey Court of Errors and Appeals and the record was remanded to the Court of Chancery. The case is brought here by writ of error, and the errors assigned resolve themselves into the single error of sustaining the priority of the lien of the water rents over that of the complainant's mortgages.

The court found that it was not necessary to enter into the discussions that have occupied the state courts. The court assumed that the rents, penalties, and interest claimed by the city have been imposed and incurred in conformity with the laws and constitution of the state, and that, by virtue of said laws and constitution, they are a lien on the property mortgaged to the complainant prior to that of its mortgages, and, this being so, we are only concerned to inquire whether those laws thus interpreted are or are not repugnant to the Constitution of the United States. The only clause of the Constitution supposed to be violated is that portion of the Fourteenth Amendment which declares that no state shall deprive any person of life, liberty, or property without due process of law. It is contended that the mortgages created in 1863 and 1869, there being then no valid water rents due on the lot mortgaged, invested the complainant with the first lien thereon, and that that lien is property, and that the statutes of 1852 and 1871, by giving a superior lien to water rents afterwards accused, deprive it of its said property without due process of law.

What may be the effect of those statutes in this regard upon mortgages which were created prior to the statute of 1852 it is unnecessary at present to inquire. The mortgages of the complainant were not created prior to that statute, but long subsequent thereto. When the complainant took its mortgages, it knew what the law was. It knew that by the law, if the mortgaged lot should be supplied with Passaic water by the city authorities, the rent of that water, as regulated and exacted by them, would be a first lien on the lot. It chose to take its mortgages subject to this law, and it is idle to contend that a postponement of its lien to that of the water rents, whether after accruing or not, is a deprivation of its property without due process of law. Its own voluntary act, its own consent, is an element in the transaction. The cases referred to by counsel to the contrary, holding void a consent exacted contrary to the Constitution, have no bearing on these cases.

It may, however, be contended (though it is not by the counsel in this case) that the revised charter of 1871 introduced new impositions additional to the mere water rent, such as authorizing a penalty to be imposed by the Board of Public Works, if payment of the water rents were not made by a certain time, and a heavy rate of interest on rents continuing in arrear. But we look upon these provisions as merely intended to enforce prompt payment and as incidental regulations appropriate to the subject. The law which authorized these coercive measures gave to mortgagees and judgment creditors the right to pay the rents and to have the benefit of the lien thereof, so that it was in their own power to protect themselves from any such penalties and accumulations of interest. They are analogous to the costs incurred in the foreclosure of the first mortgage, which have the same priority as the mortgage itself over subsequent encumbrances.

In what we have now said in relation to the anterior existence of the law of 1852 as a ground on which this case may be resolved, we do not mean to be understood as holding that the law would not also be valid as against mortgages created prior to its passage. Even if the water rents in question cannot be regarded as taxes nor as special assessments for benefits arising from a public improvement, it is still by no means clear that the giving to them a priority of lien over all other encumbrances upon the property served with the water would be repugnant to the Constitution of the United States. The law which gives to the last maritime liens priority over earlier liens in point of time is based on principles of acknowledged justice. That which is given for the preservation or betterment of the common pledge is in natural equity fairly entitled to the first rank in the tableau of claims. Mechanics' lien laws stand on the same basis of natural justice. We are not prepared to say that a legislative act giving preference to such liens even over those already created by mortgage, judgment, or attachment, would be repugnant to the Constitution of the United States. Nor are we prepared to say that an act giving preference to municipal water rents over such liens would be obnoxious to that charge. The providing of a sufficient water supply for the inhabitants of a great and growing city is one of the highest functions of municipal government, and tends greatly to enhance the value of all real estate in its limits, and the charges for the use of the water may well be entitled to take high rank among outstanding claims against the property so benefited. It may be difficult to show any substantial distinction in this regard between such a charge and that of a tax strictly so called. But as the present case does not call for an opinion on this point, it is properly reserved for consideration when it necessarily arises.

The decree of the New Jersey Court of Errors and Appeals was affirmed.

== See also ==
- List of United States Supreme Court cases, volume 113
