= Avegno v. Schmidt =

- Supreme Court of the United States

Submitted January 12, 1885 Decided January 25, 1885
- Full case name: Avegno v. Schmidt
- Citations: 113 U.S. 293 (more) 5 S. Ct. 487; 28 L. Ed. 976

Court membership
- Chief Justice Morrison Waite Associate Justices Samuel F. Miller · Stephen J. Field; Joseph P. Bradley · John M. Harlan; William B. Woods · Stanley Matthews; Horace Gray · Samuel Blatchford

Case opinion
- Majority: Woods, joined by unanimous

Avegno v. Schmidt, 113 U.S. 293 (1885), was a case in which the United States Supreme Court held that title to property confiscated during the American Civil War was properly held by the mortgagor.

== Facts ==
The action was brought in the civil District Court for the Parish of Orleans, in the State of Louisiana. The plaintiff was heirs of the deceased Bernard Avegno, who sought to establish their title to New Orleans real estate. The case was tried without a jury, yielding a judgment for the defendants. Upon appeal to the Supreme Court of Louisiana, the judgment was affirmed. To reverse that judgment of affirmance, the plaintiffs brought this writ of error.

=== Occurrence facts ===
On April 3, 1862, Bernard Avegno, the owner of the disputed property, mortgaged it to Israel C. Harris to secure promissory notes made by Avegno, payable to his own order and endorsed by him, totaling 500, which he delivered to Harris. The mortgage contained the pact de non alienando, by which the mortgagor agreed not to sell, alienate, or encumber the mortgaged property to the prejudice of the mortgage. The notes and mortgage were afterwards transferred by Harris to Charles Morgan. The mortgage was still in force, when on January 20, 1865, the United States filed, in Louisiana District Court, a libel of information against the property, to condemn it as confiscated under the Act of July 17, 1862, 12 Stat. 589, entitled "An act to suppress insurrection, to punish treason and rebellion, and confiscate the property of rebels, and for other purposes". A writ of seizure was issued to the marshal, who, dated February 14, 1865, stated that he had seized the libeled property.

Morgan, the mortgage creditor, intervened in the suit for confiscation, demanding to be paid the amount due on his mortgage. The district court, on August 1, 1865, decreed the property forfeited to the United States. He ordered it to be sold, and dismissed Morgan's claims, on the ground that his mortgage "could not be acknowledged." The property was not sold, nor were any proceedings taken.

=== Procedural facts ===
On June 25, 1867, Morgan sued Avegno in Circuit Court, for the enforcement of his mortgage. On July 11, the court allowed the property to be sold. On December 21, 1868, the property was purchased by Morgan.

On March 1, 1869, Morgan conveyed the premises to the defendants. On August 12, 1872, Avegno died, leaving his children as heirs. They claimed title to the property. Their petition stated:

that, by reason of such confiscation and forfeiture, all right, title, interest, and ownership of Bernard Avegno (deceased) was absolutely divested; that said real estate was during his lifetime forfeited to the United States; but that the naked ownership thereof was then vested in your petitioners, who were his legitimate children, living at the time of the rendition of said decree and judgment of condemnation and forfeiture; that on the 12th day of August, 1872, Bernard Avegno died, whereupon the title and interest of the United States in the said property came to an end, and said life estate was terminated, your petitioners being therefore entitled to the full ownership thereof.

== Arguments in court ==
Absent a US proceeding for condemnation and any intervention by Morgan, he would have gotten clear title to the premises.

The plaintiffs contended that the conveyed title was void, because the judgment divested Avegno of all interest and estate in the premises, the circuit court lacked jurisdiction to allow the sale, and because the district court, which did have jurisdiction, dismissed Morgan's intervention on the ground that his mortgage "could not be acknowledged".

Morgan's interest was not divested or affected by the district court. Notwithstanding the judgment, therefore Morgan had a valid mortgage superior to any claim acquired by the judgment, or that could be acquired under a subsequent sale. It did not lie with the plaintiffs to object that the United States was not a defendant to Morgan's suit. The government's standing in the property was determined by Avegno's death. Therefore, whether the government was represented in Morgan's suit was of no concern to any party. Without pointing out the necessary and proper parties to such a suit, the plaintiffs claimed that Avegno was neither, leaving no jurisdiction for the circuit court.

The defendants responded that the district court proceedings were void, because the initial seizure was invalid. Had it been valid, Avegno would have had no interest in the property. A joint resolution passed contemporaneously with the enabling legislation was intended to benefit the owner's heirs. Its intent was to enable them to inherit ownership. In Pike v. Wassell, ubi supra, a bill, filed during the owner's lifetime by the condemned's children to protect the property from any encumbrance arising from the owner's failure to pay taxes was sustained. The court declared that in the absence of any other steward, the children might act in that capacity.

These decisions apparently sustain the plaintiff's contention that foreclosing the mortgage was without the necessary parties, and was therefore void for want of jurisdiction.

The defendants responded that because Avegno's mortgage contained the pact de non alienando (in which the mortgagor agrees not to alienate/encumber the premises to the prejudice of the mortgage), he was the only necessary party to Morgan's suit. The effect of such a stipulation was well settled in Louisiana. In Nathan v. Lee, 2 Martin N.S. 32, the effect was decided to be that

the mortgagee is not bound to pursue a third possessor, but may have the hypothecated property seized in via executina as if no change had taken place in its possessors, because any alienation or transfer made in violation of the pact de non alienando is ipso jure void, as it relates to the creditor, and that this effect of the pact is not annulled by the provisions of the Civil Code in relation to mortgages, and the rules laid down for pursuing the action of mortgage.

In Stanbrough v. McCall, 4 La. Ann. 324, the court reviewed the cases on this subject and held that where a mortgage contained the pact de non alienando, a party that purchases the property from the mortgagor cannot claim to be in any better condition than such mortgagor, and cannot plead any other exception, and that any alienation in violation of the pact is null.

These cases, and those cited in the note, establish that non alienando mortgagees may enforce mortgages by proceeding against the mortgagor alone, without regard to subsequent disposition of the property, and that this binds anyone relying on such a disposition.

In the Avegnor case, the Louisiana Supreme Court held that there was such a privity between a person whose life estate had been condemned under the Act of July 17, 1862, and his heirs, that the latter were bound by a suit and decree to enforce a mortgage executed by their ancestor containing the pact de non alienando, to which the ancestor alone had been made a party defendant. It is sustained by Wallach v. Van Riswick, ubi supra, as will appear by the following passages from that Court's opinion:

If it be contended that the heirs of Charles S. Wallach," the person whose property had been condemned,

cannot take by descent unless their father, at his death, was seized of an estate of inheritance, e.g., reversion or a remainder, it may be answered that even at common law it was not always necessary that the ancestor should be seized to enable the heir to take by descent. Shelley's Case is that where the ancestor might have taken and been seized, the heir shall inherit. Fortescue, J., in Thornby v. Fleetwood, 1 Str. 318.

If it were true that at common law the heirs could not take in any case where their ancestor was not seized at his death, the present case must be determined by the statute. Charles S. Wallach was seized of the entire fee of the land before its confiscation, and the act of Congress interposed to take from him that seizing for a limited time. That it was competent to do, attaching the limitation for the benefit of the heirs. It wrought no corruption of blood. In Lord de la Warre's Case, 11 Coke 1a, it was resolved by the justices

that there was a difference betwixt disability personal and temporary and a disability absolute and perpetual, as where one is attainted of treason and felony, that is an absolute and perpetual disability, by corruption of blood, for any of his posterity to claim any inheritance in fee simple, either as heir to him or any ancestor above him, but when one is disabled by Parliament (without any attainder) to claim the dignity for his life, it is a personal disability for his life only, and his heir, after his death, may claim as heir to him or to any ancestor above him.

There is a close analogy between that case and the present.

Without pursuing this discussion further, we repeat, that to hold that any estate or interest remained in Charles S. Wallach after the confiscation and sale of the land in controversy, would defeat the avowed purpose of the confiscation act and the only justification for its enactment, and to hold that the joint resolution was not intended for the benefit of his heirs exclusively, to enable them to take the inheritance after his death, would give preference to the guilty over the innocent. We cannot so hold.

These extracts show that the court's opinion was that title to an estate condemned under the 1862 Act passed to the owner's heirs, who did not derive their title from the United States or the confiscation.

Avegno was therefore the only possible party to the suit brought by Morgan to foreclose his mortgage. The proceedings and sale were valid and binding on the plaintiffs, and vested title in Morgan, which he conveyed to the defendants.

The plaintiffs insisted that the mortgage had been declared inoperative and void by the district court, in dismissing Morgan's attempt to condemn the mortgaged property, and that the defendants were bound by that judgment. However, this defense should have been advanced in Morgan's suit. A competent court's decree cannot be attacked by defense that the defendant never made. Also, the district court had no jurisdiction in the matter. The record does not make clear that the district court intended to pass upon the mortgage's validity or that it had the jurisdiction to do so.

The judgment was affirmed.

== See also ==
- List of United States Supreme Court cases, volume 113
- Notes on the United States reports. 1900. pp. 156–.
- Syrett, John (2005). The Civil War Confiscation Acts: Failing To Reconstruct The South. Fordham Univ Press. p. 178. ISBN 9780823224890.
