= Davison v. Von Lingen =

- Supreme Court of the United States

Argued December 12, 1884 Decided January 5, 1885
- Full case name: Davison v. Von Lingen
- Citations: 113 U.S. 40 (more) 5 S. Ct. 346; 28 L. Ed. 885

Holding
- A stipulation that a chartered ship was to sail from its current berth to a destination was a condition precedent to the contract, which was broken when the vessel did not sail directly to the destination.

Court membership
- Chief Justice Morrison Waite Associate Justices Samuel F. Miller · Stephen J. Field; Joseph P. Bradley · John M. Harlan; William B. Woods · Stanley Matthews; Horace Gray · Samuel Blatchford

Case opinion
- Majority: Blatchford, joined by unanimous

Davison v. Von Lingen, 113 U.S. 40 (1885), was a United States Supreme Court case in which the court held that a stipulation that a chartered ship was to sail from its current berth to a destination was a condition precedent to the contract, which was broken when the vessel did not sail directly to the destination. In the manner of cases named after ships, this case is also called The Whickham.

== Background ==
On 1 August 1879, a charter-party was entered into between the owners of the steam-ship Whickham and the firm of A. Schumacher & Co., composed of George A. Von Lingen, Carl A. Von Lingen, and William G. Atkinson. The charter-party stipulated that the ship was "now sailed, or about to sail, from Benizaf, with cargo, for Philadelphia". Before signing the charter party, the charterers asked to have in it a guarantee that the steamer would reach Philadelphia in time to load a cargo for Europe in August, but this was refused. They declined to have inserted the words "sailed from, or loading at Benizaf."

At the time, the steamer was at "Benizaf" (Note: It is unclear if this referred to Béni Saf, which is in current-day Algeria.) in Morocco, only three-elevenths loaded. On August 7, the ship left port intended to eventually reach Philadelphia, but it headed for a stop in Gibraltar. It left port again, now headed to Philadelphia, on August 9.

On learning when the steamer left Gibraltar, they proceeded to look for another vessel. The unloading of the steamer at Philadelphia was completed September 7, but the charterers repudiated the contract.

== Decision ==
The contract was broken when the vessel was found not to have left on time.
