= Carter v. Burr =

- Supreme Court of the United States

Argued November 24–25, 1884 Decided March 16, 1885
- Full case name: Carter v. Burr
- Citations: 113 U.S. 737 (more) 5 S. Ct. 713; 28 L. Ed. 1147

Court membership
- Chief Justice Morrison Waite Associate Justices Samuel F. Miller · Stephen J. Field; Joseph P. Bradley · John M. Harlan; William B. Woods · Stanley Matthews; Horace Gray · Samuel Blatchford

Case opinion
- Majority: Waite, joined by unanimous

Carter v. Burr, 113 U.S. 737 (1885), was a case regarding a promissory note that was held by the appellee which secured by mortgage of premises in the City of Washington, DC to the appellant, to decide whether other transactions regarding the property would pay this note, or if it would instead remain in force, along with the right to participate in the proceeds arising from a sale under the mortgage.

== Decision ==
Chief Justice Waite delivered the opinion of the Court.

On the 29th of May, 1873, Joseph Daniels bought of John E. Carter certain parts of lots 1 and 24, in square 514, of the City of Washington, for which he paid $4,000 cash in hand, and gave his three promissory notes for $4,000 each, payable respectively in one, two, and three years from date, with interest at the rate of eight percent per annum. The notes were secured on the property by a deed of trust to Dorsey E. W. Carter, trustee. When the first note fell due, in 1874, Daniels was unable to meet it, and John E. Carter, who then held it, pressed him for payment. On the 7th of July, 1874, he entered into a contract with Seth A. Terry, by which he assigned to Terry his interest in what were known as the "Eight-hour Law cases" and the "Twenty percent cases," for the consideration of $10,000, of which $5,000 was paid in hand and the remaining $5,000 was to be paid by taking up, on or before the first day of September then next, certain notes of Daniels secured by a deed of trust of his homestead. The notes, when taken up, were to be held by Terry for three years from the date of the contract, if the "Eight-hour Law" and "Twenty percent" cases were not paid before that time. If the cases were paid within the three years, the notes were to be given up to Daniels, but if not so paid, Terry was authorized to enforce their collection by a sale of the property covered by the deed of trust.

Among the notes to be taken up by Terry under this contract was that given to John E. Carter, payable one year after date, and secured with the other two notes by the deed of trust to Dorsey E. W. Carter. In order to comply with the contract, Terry was under the necessity of borrowing $3,000 from C. C. Burr, to secure which he agreed to pledge the Carter note as collateral when he took it up.

On the 6th of May, 1874, John E. Carter left the Daniels note with the Farmers' and Mechanics' National Bank of Georgetown, for collection when it fell due. The note remained in that bank until August 29, 1874, when it was returned to Carter unpaid.

Burr did not have the money on the first of September which he had agreed to loan Perry, but he expected to receive it soon. Perry therefore arranged with the Second National Bank of Washington to advance the $3,000 for a few days, and about the first of September he went to the store of Dorsey E. W. Carter, where John E. Carter then was, and, with money of his own, paid to John E. Carter all that was due on the note except $3,000. He told Carter if he would call at the Second National Bank in the course of the day, the bank would pay him that sum. Carter then gave Terry the note uncancelled and endorsed in blank. The note shows only one endorsement of payment, and that is as follows: "Interest on the within paid to September 29, 1874."

Terry, after he got the note from Carter, took it to the Second National Bank and left it there, the bank agreeing to pay Carter the $3,000 when he called. Carter did call in the course of the day and got his money. A few days afterwards, Burr went to the bank, paid the sum which had been advanced to Carter, and took the note away. No entries of the transaction were made on the books of the bank, but Terry paid the interest on the advance made by the bank from the time the money was given to Carter until it was repaid by Burr. Terry had not paid his debt to Burr when the decree below was rendered.

After the first note had got in this way into the possession of Burr, Dorsey E. W. Carter obtained from John E. Carter the second Daniels note under circumstances which, in the opinion of the court below, postponed his lien under the trust deed to that of Nathaniel Carusi, who had previously bought the third note from John E. Carter. The court at special term found that the note held by Mrs. Burr had been paid and cancelled, and, after finding the amount due Dorsey E. W. Carter and Carusi, respectively, on the second and third notes, ordered a sale of the property under the trust deed, and an application of the proceeds first to the payment of the amount due Carusi, and second of that due to Dorsey E. W. Carter. From this decree Mrs. Burr appealed to the general term. Pending that appeal, the property was sold under the decree of the court in special term to Dorsey E. W. Carter for $8,990. This sale was confirmed in special term, with the consent of all the parties, on the 26th of November, 1878.

The appeal of Mrs. Burr came on for hearing at the general term, and on the 23d of December, 1880, a decree was entered reversing the decree of the special term so far as it ordered the payment of the proceeds of the sale to Dorsey E. W. Carter, after satisfying the amount due on the note held by Nathaniel Carusi, in preference to Mrs. Burr, and directing that Mrs. Burr be "admitted to participate to the amount of $2,748.47 in the fund" arising from the sale to Dorsey E. W. Carter. The court further found that after the decree at special term, the fund in court had been distributed, and that Dorsey E. W. Carter had received the money which of right belonged to Mrs. Burr. It therefore ordered Carter to pay the amount belonging to Mrs. Burr, with interest from the date of the decree. From this decree in favor of Mrs. Burr Carter took the present appeal. None of the parties to the suit are parties to the appeal except Mrs. Burr, as administratrix of the estate of her deceased husband, and Dorsey E. W. Carter.

As the case comes to us, the only question to be determined is whether what was done by John E. Carter and Terry when Terry got possession of the note now held by Mrs. Burr was a payment of the note by Daniels to Carter, through Terry, as the agent of Daniels, or a sale and transfer of the note by Carter to Terry. As to some of the facts connected with this transaction there is a great conflict of testimony, but in respect to those which are to our minds controlling, there is but little, if any, dispute.

As between Terry and Daniels, it is clear the note was not paid. By the express terms of their agreement, Terry was to "take up" the note from Carter and hold it until he was paid either by the "Eight-hour Law" and "Twenty percent" cases or otherwise. If not paid in three years, the security could be enforced. The real point of difference is as to the understanding which Carter had of the transaction. Did he take the money supposing the note was thereby paid and cancelled, or did he transfer the note to Terry to be held by him until paid by Daniels? Upon full consideration of the evidence, we think it was the intention of Carter to transfer the note. He got his money from or through Terry, and not from Daniels, the maker of the note. He had been pressing Daniels for payment, but without success. The note remained at the bank, where it had been deposited for collection, until within two days of the time when, under the arrangement between Terry and Daniels, it was to be taken up by Terry. Carter then went and got it into his own possession. When Terry came to take it up, he had not money enough to pay for it in full. He paid what he had, which reduced the amount required to just the sum Burr had agreed to loan him. When this payment was made, Carter gave him the note endorsed in blank, without cancellation in whole or in part, on the understanding that if Carter called in a short time at the bank he would get the remaining $3,000. He did so call and got his money. Under these circumstances, we do not doubt that Carter at the time fully understood the arrangement which had been made between Terry and Daniels, and took the money from Terry with the knowledge that Terry was to hold it until paid to him by Daniels. From the fact, too, that he gave the note to Terry, endorsed in blank, and uncancelled, before the $3,000 was paid, we are satisfied he must have known that Terry was expecting to raise the money upon the note itself in order to meet the balance which was due to him. The established facts on this branch of the case are entirely inconsistent with the idea that the note was understood by any of the parties to have been cancelled by the payment which Terry made or caused to be made to Carter, and it nowhere appears from anything in the case that Carter either demanded or received any release or postponement of the lien which pertained to this note.

We do not understand that any question of distribution as between the appellant and appellees arises upon the record. The special term gave Carusi, the holder of the third note, a priority over Dorsey E. W. Carter on account of the peculiar circumstances under which Carusi bought his note from John E. Carter. That question is not brought up by this appeal, as neither Carusi nor his representatives have been made parties. As to the distribution between Dorsey E. W. Carter and Mrs. Burr, the counsel for the appellant admits in his brief that the pro rata rule was followed by the general term, and no preference given to Mrs. Burr as the holder of the note first falling due. This certainly is all that Carter can ask.

== See also ==
- List of United States Supreme Court cases, volume 113
