= Anderson County Commissioners v. Beal =

- Supreme Court of the United States

Argued January 9, 1885 Decided January 26, 1885
- Full case name: Anderson County Commissioners v. Thomas P. Beal
- Citations: 113 U.S. 227 (more) 5 S. Ct. 433; 28 L. Ed. 966

Court membership
- Chief Justice Morrison Waite Associate Justices Samuel F. Miller · Stephen J. Field; Joseph P. Bradley · John M. Harlan; William B. Woods · Stanley Matthews; Horace Gray · Samuel Blatchford

Case opinion
- Majority: Blatchford, joined by unanimous

Anderson County Commissioners v. Beal, 113 U.S. 227 (1885), was a United States Supreme Court case.

== Background ==
Bonds issued by Anderson County, Kansas, under legislative authority, and in payment of its subscription to the stock of a railroad company, after the majority of the voters of the county had at an election, voted in favor of subscribing for the stock and issuing the bonds, recited, on their face, the wrong statute, but also stated that they were issued "in pursuance to the vote of the electors of Anderson County, September 13, 1869." The statute in force required that at least 30 days' notice of the election should be given, and made it the duty of the Board of County Commissioners to subscribe for the stock and issue the bonds, after such assent of the majority of the voters had been given. In a suit against the board on coupons due on the bonds, brought by a bona fide holder of them, it appeared, by record evidence, that the board made an order for the election 33 days before it was to be held, and had canvassed the returns and certified that there was a majority of voters in favor of the proposition, and had made such vote the basis of their action in subscribing for the stock and issuing the bonds to the company, and the court directed the jury to find a verdict for the plaintiff.

After the plaintiff had offered in evidence the coupons sued upon, and one of the bonds (the bond having on it a certificate of the auditor of the state, dated March 27, 1872, that it had been regularly issued, and had been duly registered in his office under the Act of March 2, 1872, and a guarantee by the company of the payment of it and of its coupons), and the order of August 11, 1869, and the proceedings of September 17, 1869, and July 8, 1870, and September 5, 1870, and a copy of the registration of the bonds in the office of the auditor of the state, he rested his case. Thereupon the defendant demurred to the evidence and asked the court to declare the law to be that upon the pleadings and proofs the plaintiff was not entitled to recover; but the court refused so to do, and the defendant excepted.

The defendant then introduced the two resolutions of November 5, 1869, above set forth, and also gave evidence for the purpose of showing that previous notice of the holding of the election was published in a newspaper at Garnett only twenty-four days before the day of the election, and not thirty days. There was also evidence given in reply by the plaintiff to show that the county paid the interest on the bonds every year, down to that which fell due January 1, 1881; that in March 1872, when the bonds were registered in the office of the auditor of the state, they belonged to the company, and that it afterwards sold them for full value to various parties. At the close of the evidence, the court instructed the jury to find a verdict for the plaintiff, and the defendant excepted to such instruction.
