= Gumbel v. Pitkin =

- Supreme Court of the United States

Argued January 26, 1885 Decided March 2, 1885
- Full case name: Gumbel v. Pitkin
- Citations: 113 U.S. 545 (more) 5 S. Ct. 616; 28 L. Ed. 1128

Court membership
- Chief Justice Morrison Waite Associate Justices Samuel F. Miller · Stephen J. Field; Joseph P. Bradley · John M. Harlan; William B. Woods · Stanley Matthews; Horace Gray · Samuel Blatchford

Case opinion
- Majority: Miller, joined by unanimous

Gumbel v. Pitkin, 113 U.S. 545 (1885), was a case brought in error to the Circuit Court of the United States for the District of Louisiana to dismiss a writ of error.

When a third party intervenes in a pending suit to claim property in the custody of the marshal by virtue of a writ of attachment issued therein, a judgment dismissing his intervention is final as to that issue, and one distributing the proceeds of the property to other parties is also final.

When a writ of error gives the names of all parties as they are found in the record of the case in the court below, and there is nothing in the record to show that there were other parties, the writ is sufficient even if the defendants in error are there described by firm names, as A. B. & Co., &c. This case distinguished from The Protector, 11 Wall. 82.

Motion to dismiss and affirm. The grounds of the first motion were (1) that no copy of the writ had been lodged with the clerk; (2) that no assignment of errors was transmitted with the record; (3) that the writ of error did not set forth the names of the members of the firms mentioned in the writ as defendants, and there was nothing in the record by which the irregularity could be corrected; (4) that the judgment appealed from was not a final judgment.

== Decision ==
Justice Miller delivered the opinion of the Court.

A motion was made to dismiss the writ of error in this case on the following grounds:

1. The writ of error was never served by lodging a copy thereof with the clerk of the court.
2. No assignment of errors was transmitted with the record, as required by the rules of the court and by § 997 Rev.Stat.
3. The writ of error does not set forth the names of the members of the several firms mentioned in the writ as defendants, and there is nothing in the record by which this irregularity may be corrected.
4. The original petition demands restoration of the goods seized by the marshal to the sheriff on the ground of previous seizure by that officer under an attachment emanating from the state court; the amended petition abandons that ground and goes for priority in the distribution of the proceeds of sale in the marshal's hands, the result of an order of sale pendente lite; such a petition is a mere rule or motion for distribution of proceeds, and a judgment rendered thereon is not reviewable by writ of error.

The high court found:

1. The first appeared to be unfounded in fact, as the record now before us shows that the writ was filed in the circuit court June 14, 1884.
2. The second was met by the decision of this Court in the case of the School District of Ackley v. Hall, 106 U. S. 428, where it is said that a writ of error will not be dismissed for want of jurisdiction by reason of a failure to annex thereto or return therewith an assignment of errors pursuant to the requirements of § 997 Rev.Stat. Nor does Rule 8 require a copy of assignment of errors in the transcript when no such assignment was filed in the court below.
3. The fourth ground of dismissal was equally untenable.

The record shows that a large number of the creditors of Joseph Dreyfus, of the City of New Orleans, sued him in the circuit court of the United States, and in those actions or in one of them a writ of attachment was issued and levied on the goods of Dreyfus by the marshal, who took possession of them. The order dismissing Gumbel's intervention disposes of his rights, and is a final judgment as to that issue, as to which he has a right to a writ of error. The order distributing the proceeds of the sale is also final, as it disposes of the fund.

As regards the third ground for dismissal, the case is not so clear.

This Court has undoubtedly, from the case of Deneale v. Stump, 8 Pet. 526, to that of The Protector, 11 Wall. 82, held that all the parties to the judgment must be named in the writ of error, and that the use of the name of one of the parties, with the addition of the words, "and others," as "Joseph W. Clark and others," does not satisfy the requirement, but on the contrary shows that there were parties to the judgment or decree in the inferior court who are not named in the writ. It is upon this ground that the judgment in the case of Smith v. Clark, 12 How. 21, is distinctly placed by Chief Justice Taney in the opinion.

In the case of The Protector, 11 Wall. 82, the appeal was taken in the name of William A. Freeborn & Co., while the record showed that William A. Freeborn, James F. Freeborn, and Henry P. Gardner were the libellants.

In this Court, counsel insisted that the objection was not fatal, and that the appeal might be amended, but the Court held otherwise and dismissed the appeal.

The transcript of the record before the court showed that these parties came into the circuit court as defendants or intervenors, and prosecuted their rights throughout the whole proceedings by the designations applied to them in this writ of error and by no other names whatever. No amendment of the writ to remove this difficulty can therefore be made from the record.

The court thought that, where the writ gives all the names of the parties as they are found in the record of the case in the circuit court, and where there is nothing to show that any other person was a party than such as are so named, the court is not at liberty to indulge the presumption that there were others who were parties, when such presumption is not founded on anything in the record and would lead to a manifest injustice.

The motion to dismiss was overruled, and the case is one to be heard on the merits, and not to be affirmed on motion.

Both motions were denied.

== See also ==
- List of United States Supreme Court cases, volume 113
