= Polleys v. Black River Improvement Co. =

- Supreme Court of the United States

Submitted November 17, 1884 Decided January 12, 1885
- Full case name: Polleys v. Black River Improvement Company
- Citations: 113 U.S. 81 (more) 5 S. Ct. 369; 28 L. Ed. 938

Court membership
- Chief Justice Morrison Waite Associate Justices Samuel F. Miller · Stephen J. Field; Joseph P. Bradley · John M. Harlan; William B. Woods · Stanley Matthews; Horace Gray · Samuel Blatchford

Case opinion
- Majority: Miller, joined by unanimous

Polleys v. Black River Improvement Co., 113 U.S. 81 (1885), was a writ of error in the circuit court of Wisconsin for La Crosse County, and a motion was made to dismiss it.

The first ground of the motion was that the writ should have been directed to the supreme court of the state instead of to the circuit court of the county. The circuit court denied the relief and dismissed the bill. On appeal, the supreme court of the state reversed this judgment and delivered an opinion that plaintiff was entitled to relief in the premises;

It was claimed that the writ of error was not brought within the statute of limitations, and although the writ of error was dated the tenth day of May 1884, and was noted by the clerk as having been filed on that day, it was also marked by the clerk of the circuit court of La Crosse county, as filed on the twenty-ninth day of that month. Since it was not disputed that this was the day it was filed in his office, it was held that this was the date on which the writ of error was brought.

The courts of Wisconsin kept a book called a judgment docket containing the names of plaintiffs who recovered judgment, the defendants against whom they are recovered, the amount of the principal judgment, the costs, and the date of the judgment itself. This record is kept for the convenience of parties who seek information as to liens on real estate or for other purposes.

This docket is made up after the main judgment is settled and entered in the order-book, or record of the court's proceedings, and it may be many days before this abstract of the judgment is made in the judgment docket, according to the convenience of the clerk.

This record of the court's proceedings constitutes the evidence of the judgment, and the statute of limitations begins to run from that date. The writ of error in this case was brought five days after the two years allowed by law had expired and was thus dismissed.

== See also ==
- List of United States Supreme Court cases, volume 113
