= List of United States Supreme Court cases, volume 113 =

Supreme Court of the United States
- Interactive map of Supreme Court of the United States
- 38°53′26″N 77°00′16″W
- Established: March 4, 1789; 237 years ago
- Location: Washington, D.C.
- Coordinates: 38°53′26″N 77°00′16″W
- Composition method: Presidential nomination with Senate confirmation
- Authorised by: Constitution of the United States, Art. III, § 1
- Judge term length: life tenure, subject to impeachment and removal
- Number of positions: 9 (by statute)
- Website: supremecourt.gov

This is a list of cases reported in volume 113 of United States Reports, decided by the Supreme Court of the United States in 1885.

== Justices of the Supreme Court at the time of volume 113 U.S. ==
The Supreme Court is established by Article III, Section 1 of the Constitution of the United States, which says: "The judicial Power of the United States, shall be vested in one supreme Court . . .". The size of the Court is not specified; the Constitution leaves it to Congress to set the number of justices. Under the Judiciary Act of 1789 Congress originally fixed the number of justices at six (one chief justice and five associate justices). Since 1789 Congress has varied the size of the Court from six to seven, nine, ten, and back to nine justices (always including one chief justice).

When the cases in volume 113 U.S. were decided the Court comprised the following nine members:

Portrait	Justice	Office	Home State	Succeeded	Date confirmed by the Senate (Vote)	Tenure on Supreme Court
	Morrison Waite	Chief Justice	Ohio	Salmon P. Chase	January 21, 1874 (63–0)	March 4, 1874 – March 23, 1888 (Died)
	Samuel Freeman Miller	Associate Justice	Iowa	Peter Vivian Daniel	July 16, 1862 (Acclamation)	July 21, 1862 – October 13, 1890 (Died)
	Stephen Johnson Field	Associate Justice	California	newly created seat	March 10, 1863 (Acclamation)	May 10, 1863 – December 1, 1897 (Retired)
	Joseph P. Bradley	Associate Justice	New Jersey	newly created seat	March 21, 1870 (46–9)	March 23, 1870 – January 22, 1892 (Died)
	John Marshall Harlan	Associate Justice	Kentucky	David Davis	November 29, 1877 (Acclamation)	December 10, 1877 – October 14, 1911 (Died)
	William Burnham Woods	Associate Justice	Georgia	William Strong	December 21, 1880 (39–8)	January 5, 1881 – May 14, 1887 (Died)
	Stanley Matthews	Associate Justice	Ohio	Noah Haynes Swayne	May 12, 1881 (24–23)	May 17, 1881 – March 22, 1889 (Died)
	Horace Gray	Associate Justice	Massachusetts	Nathan Clifford	December 20, 1881 (51–5)	January 9, 1882 – September 15, 1902 (Died)
	Samuel Blatchford	Associate Justice	New York	Ward Hunt	March 22, 1882 (Acclamation)	April 3, 1882 – July 7, 1893 (Died)

== Citation style ==
Under the Judiciary Act of 1789 the federal court structure at the time comprised District Courts, which had general trial jurisdiction; Circuit Courts, which had mixed trial and appellate (from the US District Courts) jurisdiction; and the United States Supreme Court, which had appellate jurisdiction over the federal District and Circuit courts—and for certain issues over state courts. The Supreme Court also had limited original jurisdiction (i.e., in which cases could be filed directly with the Supreme Court without first having been heard by a lower federal or state court). There were one or more federal District Courts and/or Circuit Courts in each state, territory, or other geographical region.

Bluebook citation style is used for case names, citations, and jurisdictions.

- "C.C.D." = United States Circuit Court for the District of . . .
  - e.g.,"C.C.D.N.J." = United States Circuit Court for the District of New Jersey
- "D." = United States District Court for the District of . . .
  - e.g.,"D. Mass." = United States District Court for the District of Massachusetts
- "E." = Eastern; "M." = Middle; "N." = Northern; "S." = Southern; "W." = Western
  - e.g.,"C.C.S.D.N.Y." = United States Circuit Court for the Southern District of New York
  - e.g.,"M.D. Ala." = United States District Court for the Middle District of Alabama
- "Ct. Cl." = United States Court of Claims
- The abbreviation of a state's name alone indicates the highest appellate court in that state's judiciary at the time.
  - e.g.,"Pa." = Supreme Court of Pennsylvania
  - e.g.,"Me." = Supreme Judicial Court of Maine

== List of cases in volume 113 U.S. ==
Case Name	Page & year	Opinion of the Court	Concurring opinion(s)	Dissenting opinion(s)	Lower Court	Disposition
Cole v. City of La Grange	1 (1885)	Gray	none	none	C.C.E.D. Mo.	affirmed
The general grant of legislative power in a state constitution only enables the legislature to use eminent domain or taxation to take private property, without the owner's consent, for a public purpose.
Head v. Amoskeag Manufacturing Company	9 (1885)	Gray	none	none	N.H.	affirmed
Barbier v. Connolly	27 (1885)	Field	none	none	Cal. Super. Ct.	affirmed
Liverpool, New York & Philadelphia Steamship Company v. Commissioners of Emigration	33 (1885)	Matthews	none	none	C.C.S.D.N.Y.	reversed
Davison v. Von Lingen	40 (1885)	Blatchford	none	none	C.C.D. Md.	affirmed
Drennen v. London Assurance Company	51 (1885)	Harlan	none	none	C.C.D. Minn.	reversed
Hollister v. Benedict and Burnham Manufacturing Company	59 (1885)	Matthews	none	none	C.C.D. Conn.	reversed
Hess v. Reynolds	73 (1885)	Miller	none	none	C.C.E.D. Mich.	reversed
Polleys v. Black River Improvement Company	81 (1885)	Miller	none	none	Wis. Cir. Ct.	dismissed
Pullman Palace Car Company v. Speck	84 (1885)	Miller	none	none	C.C.N.D. Ill.	affirmed
Griffith v. Godey	89 (1885)	Field	none	none	C.C.D. Cal.	reversed
Rowell v. Lindsay	97 (1885)	Woods	none	none	C.C.E.D. Wis.	affirmed
Findlay v. McAllister	104 (1885)	Woods	none	none	C.C.E.D. Mo.	reversed
Central Railroad and Banking Company of Georgia v. Pettus	116 (1885)	Harlan	none	none	C.C.M.D. Ala.	reversed
Steele v. United States	128 (1885)	Woods	none	none	Ct. Cl.	affirmed
Ackley School District v. Hall	135 (1885)	Harlan	none	none	C.C.D. Iowa	affirmed
Clawson v. United States	143 (1885)	Harlan	none	none	Sup. Ct. Terr. Utah	affirmed
Bicknell v. Comstock	149 (1885)	Miller	none	none	C.C.E.D.N.Y.	reversed
United States v. Mueller	153 (1885)	Blatchford	none	none	Ct. Cl.	affirmed
Consolidated Safety-Valve Company v. Crosby Steam Gauge and Valve Company	157 (1885)	Blatchford	none	none	C.C.D. Mass.	reversed
Novelty sufficient to distinguish a patent from prior art can be suggested by facts demonstrating the practical value of the invention. Here, the fact that known versions of the invention were not used and the fact that the claimed invention was widely adopted quickly suggest that the claimed invention had some modicum of novelty that its contemporaries lacked.
Bryan v. Kennett	179 (1885)	Harlan	none	none	C.C.E.D. Mo.	affirmed
Northern Liberty Market Company v. Kelly	199 (1885)	Gray	none	none	Sup. Ct. D.C.	reversed
Tucker v. Masser	203 (1885)	Field	none	none	C.C.D. Colo.	reversed
A patent for a placer mining claim composed of distinct mining locations, some of which were made after 1870 and together embracing over one hundred and sixty acres, is valid. Affirming Smelting Co. v. Kemp, 104 U.S. 636 (1881).
Cardwell v. American Bridge Company	205 (1885)	Field	none	none	C.C.D. Cal.	affirmed
Voss v. Fisher	213 (1885)	Woods	none	none	C.C.W.D. Mich.	reversed
This case was about alleged patent infringement, and the claimed invention included a stuffed pad within a horse collar. The defendant did not infringe because the contested device did not include a stuffed pad or an equivalent.
Caillot v. Deetken	215 (1885)	Miller	none	none	C.C.D. Cal.	dismissed
The Supreme Court cannot have jurisdiction over a case based on a writ of error that was untimely filed. In this case, the filing was untimely because it came in after the end of the Supreme Court term following the filing of the writ in the circuit court.
Cheong Ah Moy v. United States	216 (1885)	Miller	none	none	C.C.D. Cal.	dismissed
A habeas corpus petition seeking to prevent a deportation is moot after the petitioner has been deported.
Price v. Pennsylvania Railroad Company	218 (1885)	Miller	none	none	Pa.	dismissed
Dakota County v. Glidden	222 (1885)	Miller	none	none	C.C.D. Neb.	dismissed
Anderson County v. Beal	227 (1885)	Blatchford	none	none	C.C.D. Kan.	affirmed
Harvey v. United States	243 (1885)	Blatchford	none	none	Ct. Cl.	multiple
Central Railroad of New Jersey v. Mills	249 (1885)	Gray	none	none	C.C.D.N.J.	affirmed
Whether a plaintiff claims federal question jurisdiction is decided based on the legal construction of its own pleading and not by the described effects of the allegations claimed by the defendant. A corporation is an antagonistic, necessary party to a stockholder's derivative suit that arises from the corporation's fraudulent conduct performed while acting in concert with other defendants.
Looney v. District of Columbia	258 (1885)	Gray	none	none	Ct. Cl.	affirmed
A government contractor cannot both sell the debts owed to them by the District of Columbia at a discount as a security and also sue the District for the difference in what they were owed.
Nashville, Chattanooga & St. Louis Railway Co. v. United States	261 (1885)	Gray	none	none	Ct. Cl.	affirmed
A consent decree is always affirmed without considering the merits of the cause.
Coon v. Wilson	268 (1885)	Blatchford	none	none	C.C.S.D.N.Y.	reversed
Spaids v. Cooley	278 (1885)	Blatchford	none	none	Sup. Ct. D.C.	reversed
Sully v. Drennan	287 (1885)	Miller	none	none	C.C.S.D. Iowa	affirmed
The assignment by a railroad company of a tax approved by a township's vote conveys the rights of the company subject to all the equities between the company and the taxpayers, if it conveys it at all. However, in a suit by a taxpayer to invalidate the tax because the company failed to comply with conditions precedent to its collection, the company and the assignee are necessary parties with an interest opposed to that of the taxpayer; the trustees of the township and the county treasurer are also necessary parties with an interest different from that of the taxpayer.
Avegno v. Schmidt	293 (1885)	Woods	none	none	La.	affirmed
Stone v. Chisolm	302 (1885)	Miller	none	none	C.C.D.S.C.	affirmed
A single action in equity is appropriate in a lawsuit against the directors of a corporation pursuant to statute when the debts of the corporation exceed the value of capital stock where the intent of the statute is that the directors' liability shall be for the "common benefit" of all interested parties. I.e., a jury is not required to find facts in such a case.
Thornley v. United States	310 (1885)	Miller	none	none	Ct. Cl.	affirmed
Baylis v. Travellers' Insurance Company	316 (1885)	Matthews	none	none	C.C.E.D.N.Y.	reversed
Pneumatic Gas Company v. Berry	322 (1885)	Field	none	none	C.C.E.D. Mich.	affirmed
Ex parte Bigelow	328 (1885)	Miller	none	none	Sup. Ct. D.C.	habeas corpus denied
Quincy v. Jackson	332 (1885)	Harlan	none	none	C.C.S.D. Ill.	affirmed
Town of Santa Anna v. Frank	339 (1885)	Harlan	none	none	not indicated	affirmed
Where there are no special findings of facts after a bench trial, the general factual finding deciding the case in the plaintiff's favor is not appealable. A dispute about a legal ruling that was properly raised will not be considered if deciding it cannot affect the judgment below.
McArthur v. Scott	340 (1885)	Gray	none	Waite	C.C.S.D. Ohio	reversed
In actions contesting wills, people who were not yet born at the time of the action cannot be bound by the decision if the representative of their interest was antagonistic to them.
Hyatt v. Vincennes National Bank	408 (1885)	Blatchford	none	none	C.C.D. Ind.	affirmed
Considering an execution-sale law requiring that real estate shall be sold at the door of the courthouse and that personal property shall only be sold if it is present at the sale in person: a literal reading of the statute requiring fixtures on the land to be removed and brought to the courthouse for the sale could not have been intended and cannot be allowed if there is another way to interpret the statute.
United States v. Jordan	418 (1885)	Blatchford	none	none	Ct. Cl.	affirmed
Chicago and Northwestern Railway Company v. Crane	424 (1885)	Matthews	none	none	C.C.S.D. Iowa	affirmed
Prentice v. Stearns	435 (1885)	Matthews	none	none	C.C.D. Minn.	affirmed
A court sitting in law cannot use an equitable doctrine to construe a contract granting an interest in land where the contract's description of the land does not include the claimed land. Here, a Native chief received land via a treaty and conveyed land to someone else with an instrument that described land that was not included in the treaty's grant of land.
Morgan v. Hamlet	449 (1885)	Matthews	none	none	C.C.E.D. Ark.	affirmed
Chase v. Curtis	452 (1885)	Matthews	none	none	C.C.S.D.N.Y.	affirmed
St. Louis, Iron Mountain and Southern Railway Company v. Berry	465 (1885)	Matthews	none	none	Ark.	affirmed
Morgan v. United States	476 (1885)	Matthews	none	none	Ct. Cl.	reversed
Provident Institution for Savings v. Jersey City	506 (1885)	Bradley	none	none	N.J.	affirmed
Union Pacific Railway Company v. Cheyenne	516 (1885)	Bradley	none	none	Sup. Ct. Terr. Wyo.	reversed
Erhardt v. Boaro I	527 (1885)	Field	none	none	C.C.D. Colo.	reversed
A posted but inchoate mining claim is valid only if there is an external reason to believe that there are precious metals within the land, such as an actual discovery of them. A mere guess by a speculator is insufficient.
Erhardt v. Boaro II	537 (1885)	Field	none	none	C.C.D. Colo.	reversed
A case in equity regarding an injunction to stop contested mining in Erhardt v. Boaro I, a case at law. Because the Supreme Court reversed the lower court in the legal case and remanded for a new trial, it reinstated an injunction pending the result of that new trial.
Richards v. Mackall	539 (1885)	Waite	none	none	Sup. Ct. D.C.	dismissal denied
Peugh v. Davis	542 (1885)	Miller	none	none	Sup. Ct. D.C.	affirmed
Gumbel v. Pitkin	545 (1885)	Miller	none	none	C.C.D. La.	dismissal denied
Fussell v. Gregg	550 (1885)	Woods	none	none	C.C.N.D. Ohio	affirmed
Fussell v. Hughes	565 (1885)	per curiam	none	none	C.C.N.D. Ohio	affirmed
City of St. Louis v. Myers	566 (1885)	Waite	none	none	Mo.	dismissed
Brown v. United States	568 (1885)	Woods	none	none	Ct. Cl.	affirmed
Chicago Life Insurance Company v. Needles	574 (1885)	Harlan	none	none	Ill.	affirmed
Pearce v. Ham	585 (1885)	Woods	none	none	C.C.S.D. Ill.	affirmed
Ayers v. Watson	594 (1885)	Bradley	none	none	C.C.W.D. Tex.	reversed
California Artificial Stone Paving Company v. Molitor	609 (1885)	Bradley	none	none	C.C.D. Cal.	dismissed
Winona and St. Peter Railroad Company v. Barney	618 (1885)	Field	none	none	C.C.D. Minn.	reversed
Kansas Pacific Railway Company v. Dunmeyer	629 (1885)	Miller	none	none	Kan.	affirmed
Schmieder v. Barney	645 (1885)	Waite	none	none	C.C.S.D.N.Y.	affirmed
Camp v. United States	648 (1885)	Harlan	none	none	Ct. Cl.	affirmed
Maxwell's Executors v. Wilkinson	656 (1885)	Gray	none	none	C.C.S.D.N.Y.	reversed
Flagg v. Walker	659 (1885)	Woods	none	none	C.C.S.D. Ill.	affirmed
Blake v. City and County of San Francisco	679 (1885)	Woods	none	none	C.C.D. Cal.	affirmed
Fourth National Bank v. Stout	684 (1885)	Waite	none	none	C.C.E.D. Mo.	dismissed
The court dismissed the appeal of a bank from a decree adjudging that it held property of another corporation in trust for the creditors of the latter and directed the bank to pay to each of the creditors.
Davies v. Corbin	687 (1885)	Waite	none	none	C.C.E.D. Ark.	affirmance denied
Boyer v. Boyer	689 (1885)	Harlan	none	none	Pa.	reversed
Soon Hing v. Crowley	703 (1885)	Field	none	none	C.C.D. Cal.	affirmed
United States v. Indianapolis and St. Louis Railroad Company	711 (1885)	Harlan	none	none	C.C.D. Ind.	affirmed
Ex parte Fisk	713 (1885)	Miller	none	none	C.C.S.D.N.Y.	habeas corpus granted
Cooper Manufacturing Company v. Ferguson	727 (1885)	Woods	Matthews	none	C.C.D. Colo.	reversed
Carter v. Burr	737 (1885)	Waite	none	none	Sup. Ct. D.C.	affirmed
Gregory v. Hartley	742 (1885)	Waite	none	none	Neb.	affirmed
United States v. Steever	747 (1885)	Gray	none	none	Ct. Cl.	affirmed
Hardin v. Boyd	756 (1885)	Harlan	none	none	C.C.E.D. Ark.	affirmed
