= Richards v. Mackall =

- Supreme Court of the United States

Submitted December 1, 1884 Decided March 2, 1885
- Full case name: Richards v. Mackall
- Citations: 113 U.S. 539 (more) 5 S. Ct. 535; 28 L. Ed. 1132

Court membership
- Chief Justice Morrison Waite Associate Justices Samuel F. Miller · Stephen J. Field; Joseph P. Bradley · John M. Harlan; William B. Woods · Stanley Matthews; Horace Gray · Samuel Blatchford

Case opinion
- Majority: Waite, joined by unanimous

Richards v. Mackall, 113 U.S. 539 (1885), was an appeal from the Supreme Court of the District of Columbia to the High Court on whether or not an appeal from that Court to this Court may be allowed by that Court sitting in the special term.

Chief Justice Waite delivered the opinion of the Court.

The Supreme Court of the District of Columbia consists of one Chief Justice and five Associate Justices. Rev.Stat.Dist.Col. § 750; 20 Stat. 320, c. 99, § 1. The law provides for both special and general terms of the court, and for an appeal from the special to the general term, but the judgments and decrees, when rendered, are, whether they be at general or special term, the judgments and decrees of the supreme court. Rev.Stat.Dist.Col. §§ 753, 772. A general term is held by three justices, two, however, constituting a quorum, and a special term by one. Rev.Stat.Dist.Col. §§ 754, 757; 20 Stat. 320, c. 99, § 2. By § 705 of the Revised Statutes of the United States, as amended February 25, 1879, 20 Stat. 320, c. 99, § 4, the final judgments and decrees of the Supreme Court of the District of Columbia, in cases where the value of the matter in dispute exceeds $2,500, may be brought to this Court for review

"upon writ of error or appeal, in the same manner and under the same regulations as are provided by law in cases of writs of error on judgments, or appeals from decrees rendered in a circuit court.

This is an appeal from a decree of the Supreme Court of the District at a general term held by Chief Justice Cartter and Associate Justices Hagner and Cox, which began on the first Monday in April 1884, and ended July 5, 1884. The transcript contains the following:

[Filed July 8, 1884]
SUPREME COURT OF THE DISTRICT OF COLUMBIA
Brooke Mackall, Jr.v. 8,118 Eq. Alfred Richards et al.

And now comes the said defendant, Alfred Richards, and appeals to the Supreme Court of the United States from the decree of the general term passed July 5, 1884, in the above cause against him.

WM. B. WEBB for defendant, Richards
The above appeal is allowed this 8th day of July 1884.
By the court.
MCARTHUR, Justice

Then follows a citation in proper form, signed by the chief justice of the court, bearing the same date as the order allowing the appeal. This citation was served October 7, 1884. Next in the transcript is the following:

In the Supreme Court of the District of Columbia the 10th day of July 1884
Brooke Mackall, Jr. v. No. 8, 118, Eq. In Error
Alfred Richards et al.

Then follows a supersedeas bond in due form, and at the foot these words:

Approved July 11, 1884 MCARTHUR, Justice. The appeal was docketed in this Court on the fifteenth of October, 1884.

The grounds of the motion may be stated thus:

1. The citation was not signed by the justice who approved the bond,
2. The citation was not served in time, and
3. Mrs. Richards and Leonard Mackall, who were defendants below, have not joined in the appeal. §§ 999, 1012, and 705 of the Revised Statutes, taken together, provide in effect that when there is an appeal from the Supreme Court of the District of Columbia to this Court, the citation may be signed by any justice of that court. Such an appeal is to be taken under the same regulations as appeals from the circuit court. § 705. On appeals from the circuit court a judge of that court may sign the citation. § 999. Clearly, therefore, when the appeal is from the Supreme Court of the District, a justice of that court may do the same thing.

The transcript in this case shows that the appeal was allowed by the court, undoubtedly sitting in special term. This, we think, may be done. An appeal in a proper case is a matter of right. The decree appealed from was the decree of the supreme court, and the court, while sitting in special term, was still the supreme court, and, as such, capable of allowing an appeal to this Court from one of its final decrees, though rendered at general term. As the general term had closed, it was quite proper to apply to the court sitting in special term for the allowance of the appeal. The allowance by the court while in session at special term would not do away with the necessity of a citation because the allowance would not have been made at the same term in which the decree was rendered. Yeaton v. Lenox, 7 Pet. 221; Railroad v. Blair, 100 U. S. 662. As the allowance was made by the court, it was quite regular for the chief justice to sign the citation. The transcript also shows that the bond was approved by the court. It seems to have been presented to the court on 10 July and approved the next day. What was done was, according to the transcript, "In the Supreme Court of the District of Columbia."

Even if the citation was not served in time, which we do not decide, the failure to serve will not work a dismissal of the appeal. Dayton v. Lash, 94 U. S. 112.

The last ground of the motion to dismiss was not relied upon in argument. The effect of what has been done was to allow a separate appeal by Alfred Richards.

The motions were overruled.

== See also ==
- List of United States Supreme Court cases, volume 113
