= Price v. Pennsylvania Railroad Co. =

Price v. Pennsylvania R. Co.
- Supreme Court of the United States

Argued January 9, 1885 Decided January 26, 1885
- Full case name: Price & Others v. Pennsylvania Railroad Company
- Citations: 113 U.S. 218 (more) 5 S. Ct. 427; 28 L. Ed. 980

Case history
- Prior: Pennsylvania Railroad Co. v. Price, 96 Pa. 256 (1881)

Holding
- Application for writ of error dismissed.

Court membership
- Chief Justice Morrison Waite Associate Justices Samuel F. Miller · Stephen J. Field; Joseph P. Bradley · John M. Harlan; William B. Woods · Stanley Matthews; Horace Gray · Samuel Blatchford

Case opinion
- Majority: Miller, joined by unanimous

Price v. Pennsylvania Railroad Co., 113 U.S. 218 (1885), was a case where the plaintiff sued the defendant for the loss of her husband by a death which the jury found, by a special verdict, to be caused by the negligence of the company's servant or servants. The Supreme Court dismissed the plaintiff's application for writ of error because there was no question of federal law presented.

== Background ==
The verdict read as follows:

We find for the plaintiff in the sum of (5,000) five thousand dollars, subject to the opinion of the court on the question of law reserved, to-wit: we find that A. J. Price at the time of his death was route agent of the United States Post Office Department, duly appointed and commissioned, his route being on the Western Pennsylvania Railroad from Allegheny City to Blairsville, in the State of Pennsylvania; that his duties as such agent required him to be on the mail car on the mail train of said road to receive and deliver mail matter; that for the purpose of his business and that of the postal department, and in accordance with the laws of the United States and the regulations of the Post Office Department, and acceptance thereof by the railroad company, one end of the baggage car on the mail train was divided off and fitted up for the use of the department in carrying the mails, and that the duties of the said route agent required him to be in said room in the car during the running of the train; that said Price was daily on said train, making a round trip from Allegheny City to Blairsville and return; that on the 23d day of July, 1877, while at his post in his room on said car, Mr. Price was killed in a collision of the mail train coming west with another train of the defendant company going east.

That said collision was caused by the negligence or misconduct of the conductor and engineer in charge of the train going east in neglecting or disobeying orders, and in failing to take necessary precaution to avoid a collision.

We find that the Pennsylvania Railroad Company, by resolution dated April 16, 1868, accepted the provisions of the Act of Assembly, approved 4th April 1868, P.L. p. 59, and that [at the] time of the collision the Pennsylvania Railroad Company was operating the Western Pennsylvania Railroad under lease.

If, under this finding of facts, and under the acts of Congress and acts of assembly offered in evidence, and the postal regulations in evidence, the court should be of the opinion that the plaintiffs, as widow and children of deceased, are entitled to recover, then judgment to be entered on the verdict in favor of the plaintiffs.

If the court should be of the opinion that the law is with the defendant, then judgment to be entered in favor of the defendant non obstante veredicto.

The trial judge held that the deceased was a person engaged in and about the train, within the meaning of the act of 1868, but that he was also within the proviso as a passenger, and gave judgment for plaintiff on the verdict. The judgment was reversed by the Supreme Court of Pennsylvania on the ground that the deceased was not a passenger within the meaning of the proviso, and a judgment was rendered for defendant, to which this writ of error was prosecuted.

A person traveling on a railroad in charge of mails, under the provision of § 4000 Rev.Stat., does not thereby acquire the rights of a passenger in case he is injured on the railroad through negligence of the company's servants.

A statute of Pennsylvania passed April 15, 1851, Purdon, Tit. Negligence 2, 1093, makes the provision, now become common, for a recovery by the widow or children of a person whose death was caused by the negligence of another, of damages for the loss of the deceased.

A statute passed April 4, 1868, Purdon, Tit. Negligence 5, 1094, provides that "Where any person shall sustain personal injury or loss of life while lawfully engaged or employed on or about the road, works, depot, and premises of a railroad company, or in or about any train or car therein or thereon, of which company such person is not an employee, the right of action or recovery in all such cases against the company shall be such only as would exist if such person were an employee, provided that this section shall not apply to passengers."

== See also ==
- List of United States Supreme Court cases, volume 113
