= St. Louis, Iron Mountain & Southern Railway Co. v. Berry =

St. Louis, I. M. & S. R. Co. v. Berry
- Supreme Court of the United States

Argued January, 1885 Decided March 2, 1885
- Full case name: St. Louis, Iron Mountain & Southern Railway Company v. Berry & Another, Railroad Commissioners
- Citations: 113 U.S. 465 (more) 5 S. Ct. 529; 28 L. Ed. 1055

Court membership
- Chief Justice Morrison Waite Associate Justices Samuel F. Miller · Stephen J. Field; Joseph P. Bradley · John M. Harlan; William B. Woods · Stanley Matthews; Horace Gray · Samuel Blatchford

Case opinion
- Majority: Matthews, joined by unanimous

St. Louis, Iron Mountain & Southern Railway Co. v. Berry, 113 U.S. 465 (1885), was a writ of error to review the action of the Supreme Court of Arkansas in refusing to restrain officers of that state from levying a tax on property of the plaintiff in error.

One section in the charter of a railway company authorized it to consolidate with other companies. Another section provided that the

capital stock and dividends of said company shall be forever exempt from taxation; the road, fixtures and appurtenances shall be exempt from taxation until it pays an interest of not less than ten percent per annum.

The court held that a new company, created by the exercise of the power to consolidate, took the property and franchises of the old company subject to the organic law as to taxation at the time of the consolidation.

A consolidation of two railway companies by an agreement which provides that all the property of each company shall be taken and deemed to be transferred to the consolidated company (naming it) "as such new corporation without further act or deed" creates a new corporation, with an existence dating from the time when the consolidation took effect, and is subject to constitutional provisions respecting taxation in force in the state at that time.

The high court assumed that the consolidation as made was authorized by, and must be referred to, the tenth section of the charter of the Cairo and Fulton Railroad; but we do not admit, what is assumed as an inference from that, that the consolidation took effect, by relation, as of the date of that charter.

The consolidated company, the St. Louis, Iron Mountain and Southern Railroad Company, the plaintiff in error, is not the identical corporation which was the Cairo and Fulton Railroad Company. The terms of the act and agreement of consolidation, which, by the express language of the charter of the Cairo and Fulton Railroad Company, became, on adoption, the charter of the consolidated company, created a new corporation.

It was spoken of as "the new company" in the resolutions of the board of directors, submitting the agreement to the stockholders for their approval, and directing the president to cause the same to be carried into effect, when approved, by calling in "the certificates of stock in this company outstanding," and exchanging them "for stock in the new company, according to the terms of the agreement." The two corporations agree to become one corporation, and a new name is given to the "new corporation." It is spoken of as such throughout the agreement of consolidation. The whole organization is changed and made new. The capital stock is made different from that of either, or the aggregate of both, each share of stock held in the Cairo and Fulton Railroad Company being exchanged for sixty-hundredths of a share in the St. Louis, Iron Mountain and Southern Railway Company. The act of consolidation is declared to be a conveyance of all the rights, privileges, and franchises of each of the constituent corporations, and of all other property, real, personal, and mixed, and all debts due, on whatever account, belonging to each corporation, to the new corporation, without further act or deed.

This new corporation did not come into existence until May 4, 1874. It came into existence as a corporation of the State of Arkansas in pursuance of its Constitution and laws, and subject in all respects to their restrictions and limitations. Among these was that one (Art. 5, sec. 48, of the Constitution of 1868) which declared that "The property of corporations, now existing or hereafter created, shall forever be subject to taxation, the same as property of individuals." This rendered it impossible in law for the consolidated corporation to receive by transfer from the Cairo and Fulton Railroad Company, or otherwise, the exemption sought to be enforced in this suit. The case is thus brought within the rule declared and applied in Louisville &c. Railroad Co. v. Palmes, 109 U. S. 244.

The court found that it was not an answer to this conclusion to say that the act of consolidation, having been made in pursuance of the tenth section of the charter of the Cairo and Fulton Railroad Company, was the exercise by that company of a right secured to it by contract which no subsequent Constitution or law of the State of Arkansas could impair or defeat. For what was the contract? Construed in the most liberal spirit in favor of the company, it cannot be extended beyond a stipulation on the part of the state that the Cairo and Fulton Railroad Company may at any time thereafter, by consolidation with any other railroad company, form and become a new corporation, with such powers and privileges as at the time when the offer is accepted and acted upon may be within the power of the state to confer, and lawful for the new corporation to accept. If acted upon before the law was changed, it might well be that all the powers and privileges originally conferred, in the charter of the Cairo and Fulton Railroad Company, including the exemption in question, would have vested in the new company. But, as it was not accepted and acted upon until a change in the organic law of the state forbade the creation of corporations capable of holding property exempt from taxation, it must be presumed that when the original company entered into the consolidation, it did so in full view of the existing law, and with the intention of forming a new corporation, such as the Constitution and laws of the state at that time permitted. That at least, we must hold to be the legal effect of the transaction. In that view, the language used by this Court at the present term in the case of Memphis & Little Rock Railroad Co. (as reorganized) v. Berry, 112 U. S. 609, is strictly applicable and is now reaffirmed.

The conclusion is unavoidable that the exemption from taxation declared in the eleventh section of the charter of the Cairo and Fulton Railroad Company did not pass by the act of consolidation to the St. Louis, Iron Mountain and Southern Railway Company.

The judgment of the Supreme Court of Arkansas was therefore affirmed.

== See also ==
- List of United States Supreme Court cases, volume 113
