= Steele v. United States =

- Supreme Court of the United States

Argued December 22, 1884 Decided January 19, 1885
- Full case name: Steele v. United States
- Citations: 113 U.S. 128 (more) 5 S. Ct. 396; 28 L. Ed. 952

Court membership
- Chief Justice Morrison Waite Associate Justices Samuel F. Miller · Stephen J. Field; Joseph P. Bradley · John M. Harlan; William B. Woods · Stanley Matthews; Horace Gray · Samuel Blatchford

Case opinion
- Majority: Woods, joined by unanimous

Steele v. United States, 113 U.S. 128 (1885), was an appeal of a case which held that a private sale of old material that arose from the breaking up of a vessel of war, made by an officer of the Navy Department to a contractor for repairs of a war vessel and machinery, is a violation of law.

The allowance of the estimated value of such material in the settlement of such contractor's accounts is a violation of law.

A settlement of such accounts at the Navy Department and at the Treasury, in which the contractor was debited with the material at the estimated value, does not preclude the United States from showing that the estimates were far below the real value, and from recovering the difference between the amount allowed and the real value.

Delay in enforcing a claim arising out of an illegal sale of property of the United States at a value far below its real worth cannot be set up as a bar to the recovery of its value.

== See also ==
- List of United States Supreme Court cases, volume 113
