= United States v. Mueller =

- Supreme Court of the United States

Submitted December 22, 1885 Decided January 19, 1885
- Full case name: United States v. Mueller
- Citations: 113 U.S. 153 (more) 5 S. Ct. 380; 28 L. Ed. 946

Court membership
- Chief Justice Morrison Waite Associate Justices Samuel F. Miller · Stephen J. Field; Joseph P. Bradley · John M. Harlan; William B. Woods · Stanley Matthews; Horace Gray · Samuel Blatchford

Case opinion
- Majority: Blatchford, joined by unanimous

United States v. Mueller, 113 U.S. 153 (1885), was a contracts case before the United States Supreme Court.

A contractor had been hired to furnish stone to the United States for a building, as well as to saw, cut, and dress it, all as "required". However, delays in the work had been caused by the United States arising from doubts as to the desirability of completing the building with the particular type of stone, as well as to the desirability of the site itself. Suspensions of work involved the examination of the building's foundation and the stone by several commissions.

The Court held that the contractor could recover damages for the enforced suspensions of, and delays in, the work by the United States. As a side item, the Court held a contract to furnish "all of the dimension stone that may be required in the construction" of a building does not include dimension stone used in "the approaches or steps leading up into the building".

== See also ==
- List of United States Supreme Court cases, volume 113
