= Chicago Life Insurance Co. v. Needles =

- Supreme Court of the United States

Argued January 29, 1885 Decided March 2, 1885
- Full case name: Chicago Life Insurance Co. v. Needles
- Citations: 113 U.S. 574 (more) 5 S. Ct. 681; 28 L. Ed. 1084

Court membership
- Chief Justice Morrison Waite Associate Justices Samuel F. Miller · Stephen J. Field; Joseph P. Bradley · John M. Harlan; William B. Woods · Stanley Matthews; Horace Gray · Samuel Blatchford

Case opinion
- Majority: Harlan, joined by unanimous

Chicago Life Insurance Co. v. Needles, 113 U.S. 574 (1885), was a decision by the United States Supreme Court. It involved the writ of error regarding a denial of a motion and final judgment rendered perpetually enjoining Chicago Life Ins. Co. from further prosecution of its business. From that judgment, a writ of error was prosecuted to the supreme court of the state, where, among other things, was assigned for error the refusal of the court of original jurisdiction to adjudge that the said statutes of Illinois were in violation of the Constitution of the United States. The judgment of the inferior court was in all things affirmed by the supreme court of the state, and from that judgment of affirmance the present writ of error is prosecuted.

An Act of the General Assembly of Illinois created a body politic and corporate by the name of the Travelers Insurance Company, with authority to carry on the business of insuring persons against the accidental loss of life or personal injury sustained while traveling by railways, steamers, and other modes of conveyance. Another Act formally accepted by the company, its name was changed to that of the Chicago Life Insurance Company, and was invested with power to make insurance upon the lives of individuals, and of persons connected by marital relations, to those applying for insurance, or in whom the applicant had a pecuniary interest as creditor or otherwise, "to secure trusts, grants, annuities, and endowments, and purchase the same in such manner and for such premiums and considerations as the board of directors or executive committee shall direct." A general law of the state, approved March 26, 1869, and which took effect July 1, 1869, entitled "An act to organize and regulate the business of life insurance"

Under the authority conferred by the latter statute, the auditor caused an examination to be made by the chief clerk of the insurance department of the state into the condition of this company. That officer reported that it had been doing a losing business for several years, was insolvent within the meaning of the statute, and that immediate steps should be taken to appoint a receiver, to the end that the affairs of the company be wound up as quickly as possible, as being for the best interests of its policyholders. As the result of that examination, the present proceedings were commenced by the auditor in the Circuit Court of Cook County under the said act of 1874. The petition filed by him shows that in his opinion the condition of the company rendered its further continuance in business hazardous to the insured. He prayed that the company be enjoined from further prosecuting its business; that a receiver be appointed to take charge of its real estate and effects, and that such other relief be granted as should be meet. An injunction was issued and a receiver appointed with authority to take possession of the property of the company, the latter being directed to execute all conveyances necessary to vest in him full title to all its property, assets, and choses in action. The company, by its answer, put the plaintiff on proof of all the material allegations of the petition.

At the final hearing, it moved the court, upon written grounds, for a final decree in its behalf; one of which was that the statutes of the state under which these proceedings were had were in violation of the Constitution of the United States in that they impaired the obligation of the contract between the state and the company, as well as of the contracts between the company and its policyholders and creditors. This motion was denied and a final judgment rendered perpetually enjoining the company from further prosecution of its business.

The whole argument in behalf of the company proceeds upon the erroneous assumption that this Court has authority to determine whether the facts make a case under the statutes of 1869 and 1874, and if it be found that they did not, that it must enforce the right of the company to continue in business, despite the final judgment to the contrary by the courts of the state which created it, whereas we have only to inquire whether the statutes in question impair the obligation of any contract which the company has with the state or violate any other provision of the national Constitution. Being of opinion that they are not open to any objection of that character, the judgment must be affirmed without any reference to the weight of the evidence upon any issue of fact made by the pleadings.

The judgment was affirmed.

== See also ==
- List of United States Supreme Court cases, volume 113
