= Pearce v. Ham =

- Supreme Court of the United States

Argued January 9, 1885 Decided March 2, 1885
- Full case name: Pearce & Another v. Ham
- Citations: 113 U.S. 585 (more) 5 S. Ct. 676; 28 L. Ed. 1067

Court membership
- Chief Justice Morrison Waite Associate Justices Samuel F. Miller · Stephen J. Field; Joseph P. Bradley · John M. Harlan; William B. Woods · Stanley Matthews; Horace Gray · Samuel Blatchford

Case opinion
- Majority: Woods, joined by unanimous

Pearce v. Ham, 113 U.S. 585 (1885), was an appeal from the Circuit Court of the United States for the Southern District of Illinois regarding a bill filed by Charles I. Ham, the appellee, against Isaac N. Pearce and Andrew J. Kuykendall, the appellants. Originally, one Joseph K. Frick contracted with the County Court of Johnson County in the State of Illinois, where he agreed to build, according to certain plans and specifications, a courthouse for said county at Vienna, the county seat, furnishing the material and completing it by the first Monday of September 1870, in consideration whereof the county court agreed to pay him $38,357 in the bonds of Johnson county, bearing ten percent interest, and due in six years. Frick never did any work on the building, and, owing to some misunderstanding with the county court, abandoned the contract and told Kuykendall that he might go on and build the courthouse if he chose to do so. On September 9, 1869, Kuykendall, as the agent and attorney in fact of Frick, assigned the contract of the latter to Ham and Pearce, Ham being the appellee, and Pearce one of the appellants, who had formed a partnership for the purpose of building the courthouse under said contract.

Frick contracted with a county to construct a public building, and gave bond with Kuykendall as surety for the performance of the contract. Frick abandoned the contract. After procuring some modifications in it at request of Ham, Kuykendall assigned the contract to Pearce and Ham as partners with equal interests. Pearce and Ham agreed with Wickwire to construct the building. Ham then left the vicinity and engaged in other work elsewhere. Wickwire constructed the building. Kuykendall received the compensation under the original contract, paid Wickwire in full for the work done by him, and divided the profits with Pearce, claiming to be partner. Held that Ham could recover one-half of the profits from Pearce and from Kuykendall.

The object of the suit was to obtain an account of what was due to Ham by virtue of his said partnership and partnership enterprise, and that Pearce and Kuykendall might be decreed to pay him what might be found due on such accounting either in cash or Johnson county bonds.

Upon final hearing upon the pleadings and evidence, the circuit court rendered a decree in favor of Ham against Kuykendall and Pearce for $5,001. The appeal of Kuykendall and Pearce brings that decree under review.

The high court found that The entire profits were appropriated by Pearce and Kuykendall, and they must account to Ham for his share and the Decree was affirmed.

== See also ==
- List of United States Supreme Court cases, volume 113
