= Coon v. Wilson =

- Supreme Court of the United States

Argued January 14–15, 1885 Decided January 26, 1885
- Full case name: Coon v. Wilson
- Citations: 113 U.S. 268 (more) 5 S. Ct. 537; 28 L. Ed. 963; 1885 U.S. LEXIS 1679

Court membership
- Chief Justice Morrison Waite Associate Justices Samuel F. Miller · Stephen J. Field; Joseph P. Bradley · John M. Harlan; William B. Woods · Stanley Matthews; Horace Gray · Samuel Blatchford

Case opinion
- Majority: Blatchford, joined by unanimous

Coon v. Wilson, 113 U.S. 268 (1885), was a suit filed in the United States Supreme Court regarding the infringement of reissued letters patent No. 8, 169, granted to the plaintiff, Washington Wilson, as inventor, April 9, 1878, on an application therefor filed March 11, 1878, for an "improvement in collars," the original patent, No. 197,807, having been granted to him December 4, 1877.

The patent was for a "standing collar" resulting in a more comfortable fit.

== Background ==
The final decree in this case was entered July 28, 1881. The decisions of the Court in Miller v. Brass Co., 104 U.S. 350, and James v. Campbell, 104 U.S. 356, were made January 9, 1882. Under those decisions and many others made by this Court since, the first and fourth claims of the reissue cannot be sustained. Although this reissue was applied for a little over three months after the original patent was granted, the case is one where it is sought merely to enlarge the claim of the original patent by repeating that claim and adding others; where no mistake or inadvertence is shown, so far as the short or sectional bands are concerned; where the patentee waited until the defendants produced their continuous band collar, and then applied for such enlarged claims as to embrace the defendants' collar, which was not covered by the claim of the original patent, and where it is apparent from a comparison of the two patents that the reissue was made to enlarge the scope of the original. As the rule is expressed in the recent case of Mahn v. Harwood, 112 U.S. 354, a patent "cannot be lawfully reissued for the mere purpose of enlarging the claim unless there has been a clear mistake, inadvertently committed, in the wording of the claim and the application for a reissue is made within a reasonably short period after the original patent was granted."

But a clear mistake, inadvertently committed, in the wording of the claim, is necessary, without reference to the length of time. In the present case, there was no mistake in the wording of the claim of the original patent. The description warranted no other claim. It did not warrant any claim covering bands not short or sectional. The description had to be changed in the reissue to warrant the new claims in the reissue. The description in the reissue is not a more clear and satisfactory statement of what is described in the original patent, but is a description of a different thing so ingeniously worded as to cover collars with continuous long bands and which have no short or sectional bands. The drawings showed no continuous band, and the statement in the original patent that "the use of the short or sectional bands produces a saving of material, as compared to the old style of continuous band," shows that the patentee was drawing a sharp contrast between the only bands he contemplated—short or sectional bands—and a continuous band of one piece of material as long as the collar. The original patent industriously excluded from its scope a continuous band. In the reissue, to cover a continuous graduated band, the two bands B B are converted into a single band composed of the parts B B and, while that is described as extending along the top or body of the collar, the "shorter graduated bands" are described as saving material, as compared with an old style continuous band, of uniform width.

While we are of opinion that the views of the circuit court, as before recited, were erroneous, we presume that if this case had been decided after January 1882, the decree would not have been for the plaintiff.

== Decision ==
The decree of the circuit court was reversed, and the case was remanded to that court, with a direction to dismiss the bill, with costs.

== See also ==
- List of United States Supreme Court cases, volume 113
