= Griffith v. Godey =

- Supreme Court of the United States

Argued December 15, 1884 Decided January 25, 1885
- Full case name: Griffith v. Godey
- Citations: 113 U.S. 89 (more) 5 S. Ct. 383; 28 L. Ed. 934

Court membership
- Chief Justice Morrison Waite Associate Justices Samuel F. Miller · Stephen J. Field; Joseph P. Bradley · John M. Harlan; William B. Woods · Stanley Matthews; Horace Gray · Samuel Blatchford

Case opinion
- Majority: Field, joined by unanimous

Griffith v. Godey, 113 U.S. 89 (1885), was a suit regarding equity of defendants who were trustees of certain property that the complainant was interested in, and which they received and disposed of. The complainant, Ellis Griffith, and his brother, John Griffith, were partners, engaged in the business of cattle raising, and resided in Kern County, California, where they occupied what is called a stock range, a tract of country on which cattle are permitted to roam and graze. It may be termed the feeding ground-the pasture land of the cattle. Although the title to the land constituting the range was in the United States, and the land was not inclosed, the right of the Griffiths to use it for the pasturage of their cattle was recognized and respected by their neighbors and other stock raisers in the county. It had excellent springs, furnishing water to cattle roaming over a large extent of country, and was capable of supporting from one to three thousand head. The property, therefore was of great value.

== Background ==
In April 1870, Pedro Altube, a member of the firm of Peres & Co., large cattle dealers in California, who was familiar with Kern county and with the character of the range, desired to purchase it for his firm, and offered for it, with the stock, $12,000.

On May 21, 1870, John Griffith died, his heirs were his two brothers, the complainant and Morris Griffith. The partnership property remained in the complainant's possession. It consisted of horned cattle, horses, and the range mentioned. The brother Morris, who would have been a proper party complainant, declined to take part in the suit. Ellis Griffith, the surviving partner, was a man of weak mind, without any knowledge of business, and barely able to read and write. The defendants were the neighbors Godey and Williams. Godey was an old resident of the county, a man of means, and had the entire confidence of the complainant. On the ninth of June, within a month after the death of the intestate, Altube spoke t Godey about purchasing the range, and stated that he would give for it, with the stock, $12,000, the sum he had offered previously in April; but Godey then had no control over the range, and could therefore give no title to it.

On July 16, Godey filed a petition for special letters of administration on the estate of the deceased, and on the nineteenth of July he was appointed special administrator

On September 17, 1870, the complainant executed a conveyance of his claim of 160 acres (0.65 km^{2}) to the defendant Godey for the sum of $500. In the bill he alleges that he did not know the contents of the instrument, but signed it at Godey's request, without intending to convey any interest in the range, and that he received no consideration for it. He was not then, nor at any other time, informed of the offer made for the range and stock by Altube, of the firm of Peres & Co. Soon after this conveyance Godey informed Altube that he and Williams would sell him the range and stock for $13,000. Altube accepted the offer on condition that a certain squatter on the land should be removed. They bought off the squatter for $500, and on the seventh of November 1870, Altube paid the $13,000 for the range and stock, which sum was equally divided between them.

It was shown that the defendant Williams participated in the fraudulent design. He never paid anything on his bid for the horses and cattle at the probate sale until weeks afterwards, and then less than one- fourth of the amount. It was not until after the cattle and horses were purchased by Altube that he paid the balance, although he knew that the probate sale could be made only for cash, and that the amount bid by him had been reported to the court as cash paid. He also knew that the property did not belong to the deceased, but to the partnership between him and the complainant.

The record shows that all the partnership property was sold within six months after the death of the deceased, so as to net over $12,000, and that out of that sum the complainant received only $500. The defendants made a large profit out of the transactions and they were required to account to the complainant, as surviving partner of the deceased, for their unjust gains. This was not done.

== Decision ==
The error of the lower court arose from treating the possessory right to the cattle range on the public lands-as it was then held by the partnership on the death of John Griffith-as not constituting any property of value which could be recognized as such by the courts, the claimants being both aliens who had never taken any steps to be naturalized. But the constitution of California, then in force, invested foreigners who were bona fide residents of the state with the same rights, in respect to the possession and enjoyment of property, a native-born citizens. Article 1, 17. And the possessory right to the range, though held by aliens, was respected by their neighbors and all cattle dealers of the country, and had a market value, as shown by the price which others were ready to pay for it. The responsibility of trustees does not depend upon the validity of the title of the grantor of the trust property. If the right or interest transferred to them can be sold for a valuable consideration, it is to be treated as property, and corresponding duties devolve upon the trustees with respect to its sale as upon the sale of property, the title of which is undisputed.

The decree of the lower court was reversed, and the cause remanded, with directions to enter a decree in conformity with this opinion; and was so ordered.

== See also ==
- List of United States Supreme Court cases, volume 113
