= United States v. Indianapolis & St. Louis Railroad Co. =

- Supreme Court of the United States

Argued January 28, 1885 Decided March 16, 1885
- Full case name: United States v. Indianapolis & St. Louis Railroad Company
- Citations: 113 U.S. 711 (more) 5 S. Ct. 716; 28 L. Ed. 1140

Court membership
- Chief Justice Morrison Waite Associate Justices Samuel F. Miller · Stephen J. Field; Joseph P. Bradley · John M. Harlan; William B. Woods · Stanley Matthews; Horace Gray · Samuel Blatchford

Case opinion
- Majority: Harlan, joined by unanimous

United States v. Indianapolis & St. Louis Railroad Co., 113 U.S. 711 (1885), regarded a suit that was brought to foreclose mortgages given to secure bonds issued by the Indianapolis and St. Louis Railroad Company. A final decree of foreclosure having been passed, the mortgaged property was sold, and the sale was confirmed by the court. The United States intervened by petition, and asked that certain sums, alleged to be due to the government on account of taxes, be first paid out of the proceeds.

It appeared that certain interest coupons of the bonds of the company were payable and were paid on the first days of September and November 1870, and that certain other interest coupons of the same company were payable on the first day of January 1872, and were then paid out of its earnings made prior to that date and during the year 1871.

The court below held:

1. That the Act of July 14, 1870, 16 Stat. 269, c. 255, § 15, did not impose an internal revenue tax on interest coupons of the bonds of the railroad company payable and paid during the last five months of that year.
2. That the law did not impose an internal revenue tax on interest coupons of such bonds payable and paid on the first day of January 1872.

The United States acquiesces in the judgment in respect to the first of these claims, but contends that the Act of July 14, 1870, imposed a tax upon interest coupons that were paid out of the corporation earnings for 1871, although such payment was not due nor made until January 1, 1872. This question depends upon the construction of § 15 of the act of 1870, which provides:

That there shall be levied and collected, for and during the year 1871, a tax of two and one-half percent on the amount of all interest or coupons paid on bonds or other evidence of debt issued and payable in one or more years after date, by any of the corporations in this section hereinafter enumerated [railroad corporations being among the number], and on the amount of all dividends of earnings, income, or gains hereafter declared,. . . whenever and wherever the same shall be payable,. . . and on all undivided profits of any such corporation which have accrued and been earned and added to any surplus, contingent, or other fund,

In construing this section in Railroad Co. v. United States, 101 U. S. 550, the Court said:

The interest in this case was neither payable nor paid in 1871, and, as the tax is not leviable or collectible until the interest is payable, we see no way in which the company can be charged on this account. The tax is not on the interest as it accrues, but when it is paid. No provision is made for a pro rata distribution of the burden over the time the interest is accumulating, and as the tax can only be levied for and during the year 1871, we think, if the interest is in good faith not payable in that year, the tax is not demandable, either in whole or in part. This decision covers the present case. The claim of the United States is not for a tax on dividends or gains, but is distinctly for a tax on interest accruing on the bonds of the railroad company, and which was not payable nor paid until after the year 1871, for and during which the act directed it to be levied and collected. We do not perceive that the liability of the corporation for tax on this interest, as such, is affected by the circumstance that the interest was paid out of the earnings made in the previous year.

The judgment was affirmed.

== See also ==
- List of United States Supreme Court cases, volume 113
