= City of St. Louis v. Myers =

St. Louis v. Myers
- Supreme Court of the United States

Argued November 24, 1884 Decided February 2, 1885
- Full case name: St. Louis v. Myers
- Citations: 113 U.S. 566 (more) 5 S. Ct. 640; 28 L. Ed. 1131

Court membership
- Chief Justice Morrison Waite Associate Justices Samuel F. Miller · Stephen J. Field; Joseph P. Bradley · John M. Harlan; William B. Woods · Stanley Matthews; Horace Gray · Samuel Blatchford

Case opinion
- Majority: Waite, joined by unanimous

St. Louis v. Myers, 113 U.S. 566 (1885), was a motion to dismiss for want of a federal question to give jurisdiction regarding Acts that admitted Missouri into the Union while leaving the rights of riparian owners on the Mississippi River to be settled according to the principles of state law and relinquishing to the City of St. Louis the rights of the United States in wharves and thoroughfares, which did not authorize the city to impair the rights of other riparian proprietors by extending streets into the river.

Chief Justice Waite delivered the opinion of the Court.

The question on which this case turned below was whether Myers, the lessee of the property situated on the bank of the Mississippi River, within the City of St. Louis, which had been improved with a view to its use, and was used in connection with the navigation of the river, could maintain an action against the city for extending one of its streets into the river so as to divert the natural course of the water and destroy the water privileges which were appurtenant to the property. The supreme court of the state decided that he could, and to reverse that decision this writ of error was brought.

We are unable to discover that any federal right was denied the city by the decision which has been rendered. The Act of Congress providing for the admission of Missouri into the Union, March 6, 1820, c. 22, 3 Stat. 545, and which declares that the Mississippi River shall be "a common high way, and forever free," has been referred to in the argument here, but the rights of riparian owners are nowhere mentioned in that act. They are left to be settled according to the principles of state law. Certainly there is nothing in the provisions of the act from which a right can be claimed by the City of St. Louis, even though it be the owner of the bed of the river, to change the course of the water as it flows to the injury of those who own lands on the banks. This act was not mentioned in the pleadings, and, so far as we can discover, it was not alluded to in the opinions of either of the courts below, except for the purpose of showing that the Mississippi River was in law a navigable stream.

By an Act passed June 12, 1866, c. 116, § 9, 14 Stat. 63, Congress relinquished to the City of St. Louis all the right, title, and interest of the United States "in and to all wharves, streets, lanes, avenues, alleys, and of the other public thoroughfares" within the corporate limits; but this did not, any more than the act providing for the admission of Missouri into the Union, purport to authorize the city to impair the rights of other riparian proprietors by extending streets into the river, and neither in the court below nor here was there been any provision referred to which it is claimed has that effect.

The case of Railway Co. v. Renwick, 102 U. S. 182, was entirely different from this. There, the question was whether the owner of a saw mill on the bank of the Mississippi River, who had improved his property by erecting piers and cribs in the river under the authority of a statute of Iowa, but without complying with the provisions of § 5254 of the Revised Statutes of the United States, could claim compensation from the railroad company for taking his property in the river for the construction of its road. The company claimed that, as Congress, in the exercise of its jurisdiction over the navigable waters of the United States, had prescribed certain conditions on which the owner of saw mills on the Mississippi River might erect piers and cribs in front of their property, the statute of Iowa under which Renwick had made his improvements was void. This we held presented a federal question and gave us jurisdiction, but nothing of that kind appears in this record.

The court was satisfied that no case has been made for its jurisdiction, and the motion to dismiss was granted.

== See also ==
- List of United States Supreme Court cases, volume 113
