= Johnny Reb (disambiguation) =

Johnny Reb or Johnny Rebel is a slang term for Confederate soldiers in the American Civil War.

Johnny Reb or Johnny Rebel may also refer to:

== People ==
- Johnny Rebb, stage name of Donald James Delbridge (1939–2014), Australian country and rock'n'roll singer
- Johnny Rebel (singer), stage name of Clifford Joseph Trahan (1938–2016), American country singer

== Other uses ==
- Johnny Reb (game), a wargame designed by John Hill
- Johnny Reb and Billy Yank (book), a 1905 novel published by Alexander Hunter
- Johnny Reb and Billy Yank (comic strip), a comic strip about the Civil War
- "Johnny Reb", an American Civil War-era song recorded in 1959 by Johnny Horton
