= United States v. Lee (1882) =

- Supreme Court of the United States

Argued October 18–19, 1882 Decided December 4, 1882
- Full case name: United States v. Lee. Kaufman and another v. Same.
- Citations: 106 U.S. 196 (more) 1 S. Ct. 240; 27 L. Ed. 171; 16 Otto 196

Case history
- Prior: Error to the Circuit Court of the United States for the Eastern District of Virginia.

Holding
- Sovereign immunity does not extend to officers of the government.

Court membership
- Chief Justice Morrison Waite Associate Justices Samuel F. Miller · Stephen J. Field; Joseph P. Bradley · John M. Harlan; William B. Woods · Stanley Matthews; Horace Gray · Samuel Blatchford

Case opinions
- Majority: Miller, joined by Field, Harlan, Matthews, Blatchford
- Dissent: Gray, joined by Waite, Bradley, Woods

Laws applied
- Act for the Collection of Taxes in the Insurrectionary Districts (12 Stat. at L. 422); Fifth Amendment

United States v. Lee, 106 U.S. 196 (1882), is a 5-to-4 ruling by the United States Supreme Court which held that the Constitution's prohibition on lawsuits against the federal government did not extend to officers of the government themselves. The case involved the heir of Mary Anna Custis Lee, wife of Confederate States of America General Robert E. Lee, who sued to regain control of Arlington House and its grounds. Arlington had been seized by the United States government in 1861 and eventually converted into Arlington National Cemetery. The estate had been sold to pay outstanding taxes, but the lawsuit contested the tax sale as improper. A jury found in favor of the Lees. The Supreme Court, too, concluded that the tax sale was illegal. In stripping the federal officers of their sovereign immunity, the Supreme Court agreed that suit against them was proper.

The jury verdict returned Arlington to the Lee family, but only temporarily. The family never returned to Arlington, but rather sold the estate to the United States government in 1883 for $150,000 ($5,183,036 in 2025 dollars).

== Background ==
=== History of the Arlington estate ===
John Parke Custis, son of Martha Washington and stepson of George Washington, purchased 1,100 acres (450 ha) of forest and farm land in 1778 and called it "Arlington." The estate was located directly across the Potomac River from the future site of Washington, D.C., in what was then Alexandria County (now known as Arlington County). John Custis died in 1781, and his son, George Washington Parke Custis, inherited the property. G.W.P. Custis hired George Hadfield, then supervising construction of the United States Capitol, to design and build a two-story Greek Revival house atop the most prominent hill on the property, a mansion Custis named "Arlington House." G.W.P. Custis' daughter, Mary Anna, married Robert E. Lee in 1831. Custis died in 1857, leaving his estate and Arlington House to his daughter.

=== Seizure of the estate ===
In April 1861, Virginia seceded from the United States and Robert E. Lee resigned his commission in the United States Army on April 20, 1861, and joined the military forces of the Confederate States of America. On May 7, troops of the Virginia militia occupied Arlington and Arlington House. With Confederate forces occupying Arlington's high ground, the capital of the Union was left in an untenable military position. Although unwilling to leave Arlington House, Mary Lee believed her estate would soon be taken by federal soldiers. So she buried many of her family treasures on the grounds and left for her sister's estate at Ravensworth in Fairfax County, Virginia, on May 14. On May 3, General Winfield Scott ordered Brigadier General Irvin McDowell to clear Arlington and the city of Alexandria, Virginia, of all troops not loyal to the United States. McDowell occupied Arlington without opposition on May 24.

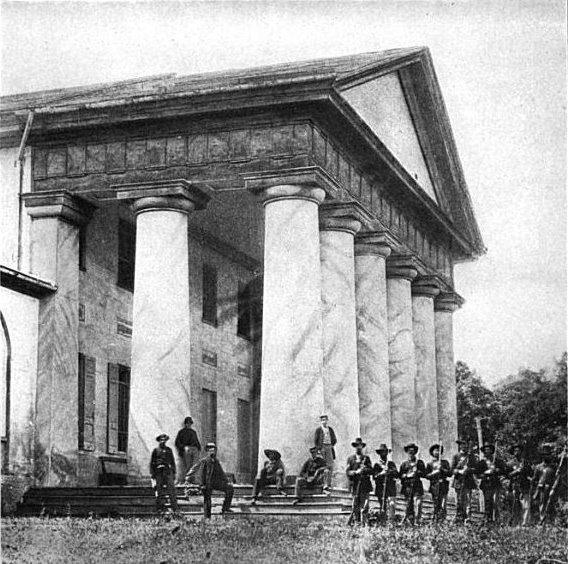
Union troops pose in front of Arlington House during the American Civil War.

On June 7, 1862, the U.S. Congress enacted the Act for the Collection of Taxes in the Insurrectionary Districts (12 Stat. at L. 422), legislation which imposed a property tax on all land in "insurrectionary" areas of the United States. The 1863 amendments to the statute required these taxes to be paid in person. Congress knew that few Confederate sympathizers would appear in person to pay the tax, thus allowing the federal government to seize large amounts of property and auction it off to raise money for the war effort. A tax of $92.07 ($2,408 in 2025 dollars) was levied on the Arlington estate in 1863. But Mary Lee, afflicted with severe rheumatoid arthritis and behind Confederate lines in Richmond, Virginia, gave the payment to her cousin, Philip R. Fendall (who lived in Alexandria). The tax collectors refused to accept his payment. On January 11, 1864, the entire estate was auctioned off to pay the tax due. (With a 50 percent penalty for nonpayment, the total of tax and fine was $138.11 ($2,843 in 2025 dollars).) Although the auction was well-attended, the U.S. government was the only bidder and won the property for $26,800 ($535,213 in 2025 dollars) (less than its assessed value of $34,100 ($701,952 in 2025 dollars)).

With local cemeteries in Alexandria County and Alexandria filling rapidly with war dead, Quartermaster General of the United States Army Montgomery C. Meigs proposed using 200 acres (81 ha) of the Arlington estate as a cemetery. The first burial there was made on May 13, 1864. United States Secretary of War Edwin M. Stanton approved the establishment of a military cemetery on June 15, 1864, creating Arlington National Cemetery. By the end of the war in April 1865, more than 16,000 people had been buried at Arlington. In September 1866, a memorial and a burial vault (containing the remains of 2,111 U.S. and Confederate soldiers who died at the First Battle of Bull Run, Second Battle of Bull Run, and along the Rappahannock River) were buried in Lee's former wildflower garden on the mansion's east side beneath the Civil War Unknowns Monument, a memorial to honor unknown soldiers who had died during the American Civil War.

=== Suit by Lee's heirs ===
Robert E. Lee made no attempt to restore his title to Arlington before his death in 1870. Mary Lee died in 1873, having returned to the house a few months before her death. Too upset at its condition, she refused to enter and left after just a few moments.

In April 1874, Robert E. and Mary Lee's eldest son, George Washington Custis Lee, petitioned Congress for payment for the Arlington estate. Lee argued that tax sale of the entire property (rather than just that portion needed to pay the tax debt) amounted to confiscation and was unconstitutional. He also argued that the tax collectors' refusal to accept payment made the proceedings null and void. Finally, he asserted that the federal government should only be able to secure a life interest in the property (in other words, seize it only as long as Mary Lee lived) and could not assert title to the estate without the consent of the state of Virginia. He offered not to litigate the seizure of Arlington if paid. Lee's petition was referred to the United States House Committee on the Judiciary on April 6, but it was not acted on.

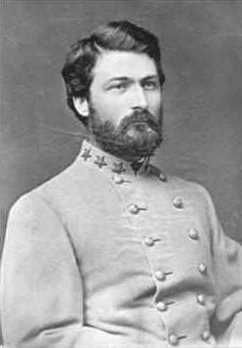
George Washington Custis Lee before 1865, in his Confederate colonel's uniform.

In April 1877, Lee filed suit in Alexandria County circuit court to eject the U.S. government from Arlington. His suit named, among others, Frederick Kaufman (a civilian in the United States Department of War who oversaw Arlington National Cemetery) and R.P. Strong (a U.S. Army officer who supervised the portion of Arlington which had become an Army post). Almost a thousand others were named in the suit, all of them former African American slaves who had been allowed to form a settlement known as Freedmen's Village on part of the estate. On July 6, United States Attorney General Charles Devens filed a writ of certiorari asking that the case be transferred to the United States Circuit Court for the Eastern District of Virginia, a request which the federal court approved three days later. On July 16, Devens filed a motion to have Lee's suit dismissed on the grounds that the Constitution made the federal government immune to suits at law (unless it gave its consent). Lee filed a demurrer, pointing out that the government had taken the contradictory position of being a private buyer in a tax sale and yet asserting sovereign immunity as if its purchase were a governmental act. On March 15, 1878, the circuit court held that not only did the court have jurisdiction to decide the issue but that the lawsuit presented a controversy over facts which should be decided by a jury. A jury trial was held January 24–30, 1879, in Alexandria. The jury found for Lee, concluding that the demand to accept payment only in person violated the Constitution's due process guarantees.

The federal government asked on April 6, 1879, that the jury verdict be set aside on the basis of the Supreme Court's ruling in Carr v. United States, 98 U.S. 433, (a decision handed down on March 3, after the jury's verdict had been reached). Carr v. United States involved a case where the city of San Francisco, California, transferred title to property within the city to the federal government even though a private citizen claimed title to the land. The Supreme Court reaffirmed in Carr that the federal government cannot be sued without its consent, that a suit against an officer or agent of the federal government does not bind the government itself, and that courts do not have jurisdiction over title suits against the federal government's officers and agents. Only when property has been transferred by the courts does a private citizen establish a right to establish or reclaim rights to title. But the circuit court in Lee held that much of the decision in Carr was dicta, and reaffirmed the jury decision.

Two appeals were made to the U.S. Supreme Court. The first was by the United States government itself, while the second was made by the government on behalf of Kaufman and Strong. The question was whether the title actually transferred to the federal government. If yes, then Lee had no claim; but if not, then Lee had standing to sue to reclaim his title to the land. To determine this, the Supreme Court first had to rule out all other grounds for a suit, and then determine whether the tax sale actually transferred the title.

== Opinion of the Court ==
Associate Justice Samuel Freeman Miller wrote the decision for the majority, joined by Associate Justices Stephen Johnson Field, John Marshall Harlan, Stanley Matthews, and Samuel Blatchford. Most of Miller's ruling was technical.

After reviewing the facts of the case, Miller presented the two critical questions in the case: 1) Were there other grounds for a suit other than transfer of title in error, and 2) whether the tax sale had actually transferred title. The members of the Court were agreed that there no errors regarding interpretation of the law by the circuit court, in the jury instructions, or in the documents of the tax sale. But, citing Bennett v. Hunter, 72 U.S. 326 (1869), (which had involved the nearby Abingdon estate); Tacey v. Irwin, 85 U.S. 549 (1873); and Atwood v. Weems, 99 U.S. 183 (1878), the majority reaffirmed that a tax collector's refusal to accept payment was the equivalent of payment. The majority considered whether a rule had been properly adopted by the tax commissioners to accept payment only from the title holder him or her self, and found that it had properly been adopted. However, the majority found that denial of a taxpayer's right to pay through an agent was improper:

...[T]he commissioners, having in the execution of the law acted upon a rule which deprived the owner of the land of an important right, a right which went to the root of the matter, a right which has in no instance known to us or cited by counsel been refused to a tax-payer, the sale made under such circumstances is invalid, as much so as if the tax had been actually paid or tendered.

The government claimed that prior Court rulings on tax payment regulations were not applicable because the 1862 the law specifically required payment to be made in person, but the Court disagreed and distinguished its previous decisions as being based on the 1862 law and its 1863 amendments. The government also claimed that the law did not permit payment to be made between the announcement of the tax sale and the date of the sale if the government were the purchaser. But the majority pointed out that this created a contradiction: How could the title holder know that the government was the purchaser until the actual purchase had occurred? This made no sense, and subsequently that section of the law was invalid.

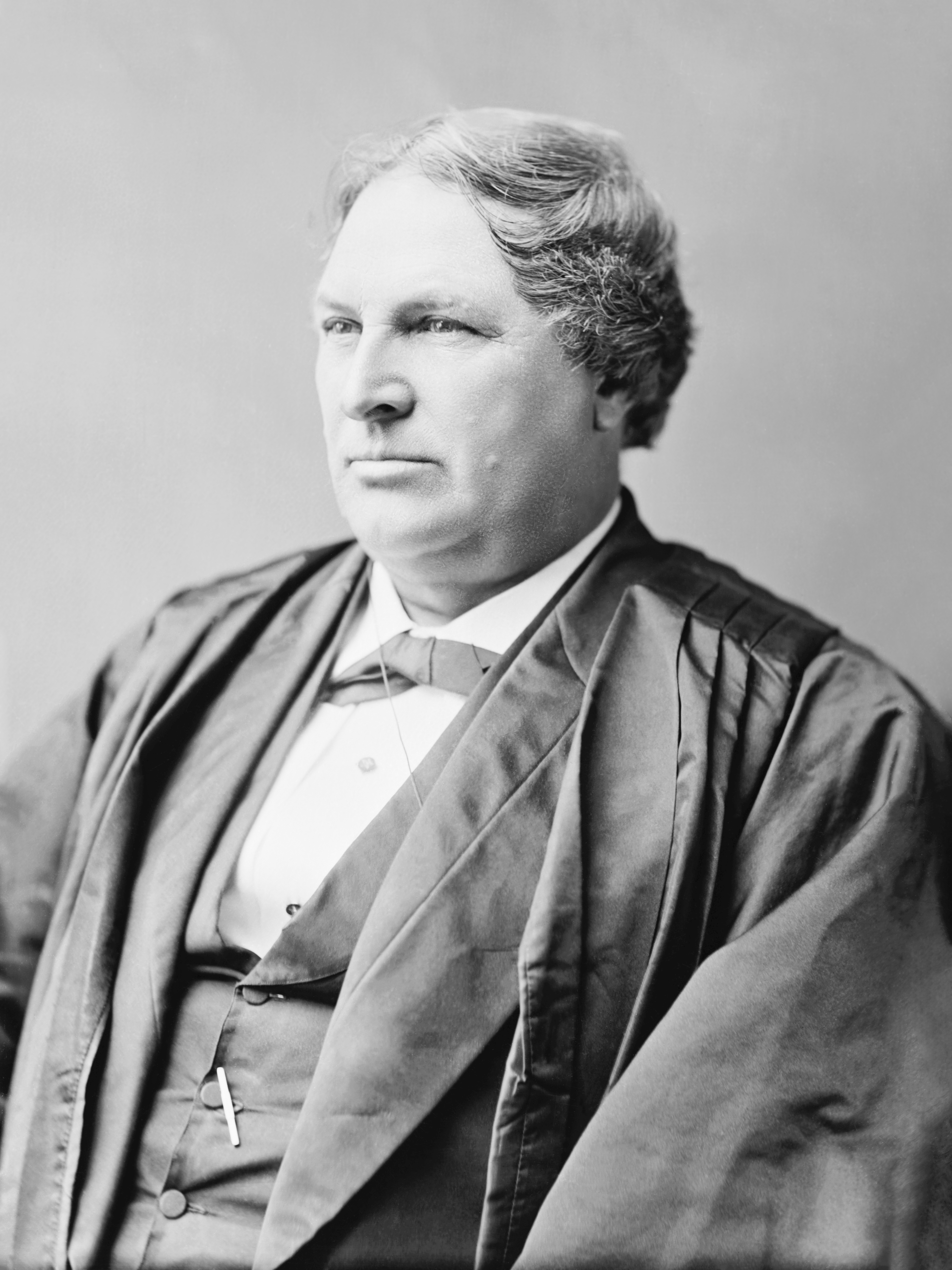
Justice Samuel Miller, who wrote the majority opinion in Lee.

The Court next considered whether payment had been attempted. Relying on Cooley v. O'Connor, 79 U.S. 391 (1870), the majority noted that nothing in the law or the Constitution indicated that the government's title to land "should have any greater effect as evidence of title than in the case of a private purchaser, nor why it should not be subject to the same rules in determining its validity, nor why the payment or tender of the tax, interest, and costs, should not be made by an agent in the one case as in the other." Since there was uncontested evidence that Lee had attempted to make payment in full, the tax should have been considered paid.

But did sovereign immunity bar any challenge to the government's title, once title had been transferred? Justice Miller engaged in a lengthy historical review of the privilege of sovereign immunity, its roots in English and common law, its acceptance in Colonial America, its enshrinement in the Constitution, and its growing acceptance by the courts of the United States. But the Lee lawsuit was against Kaufman and Strong as individuals, not just the United States government. The government argued that title in the Arlington estate was held by the government, not these officers, and thus was immunized against suit. The Court, citing Meigs v. M'Clung's Lessee 13 U.S. 11 (1815), concluded there was no difference whether the officers were in possession of the land themselves or whether they held the land as agents of the government. The Court relied heavily on Osborn v. Bank of the United States, 22 U.S. 738 (1824), in which officers of the state of Ohio (rather than the state itself) were sued but the actual party affected was the sovereignly immune state. The majority reaffirmed the statement of principle in Davis v. Gray: "Where the State is concerned, the State should be made a party, if it can be done." The Court agreed that much of the holding in Carr v. United States was dicta, and could not be relied upon by the government.

The government also claimed that since Arlington had been put to a lofty public use (a cemetery and a fort), Lee should not be able to disturb title to it after so long a period of time. But the Court strongly disagreed, arguing that the Fifth Amendment made no such distinction. In ringing language, the majority upheld Lee's right against deprivation of property without due process of law:

The defence stands here solely upon the absolute immunity from judicial inquiry of every one who asserts authority from the executive branch of the government, however clear it may be made that the executive possessed no such power. Not only no such power is given, but it is absolutely prohibited, both to the executive and the legislative, to deprive any one of life, liberty, or property without due process of law, or to take private property without just compensation. ... No man in this country is so high that he is above the law. No officer of the law may set that law at defiance with impunity. All the officers of the government, from the highest to the lowest, are creatures of the law, and are bound to obey it. It is the only supreme power in our system of government, and every man who by accepting office participates in its functions is only the more strongly bound to submit to that supremacy, and to observe the limitations which it imposes upon the exercise of the authority which it gives. Courts of justice are established, not only to decide upon the controverted rights of the citizens as against each other, but also upon rights in controversy between them and the government; and the docket of this court is crowded with controversies of the latter class. Shall it be said, in the face of all this, and of the acknowledged right of the judiciary to decide in proper cases, statutes which have been passed by both branches of Congress and approved by the President to be unconstitutional, that the courts cannot give a remedy when the citizen has been deprived of his property by force, his estate seized and converted to the use of the government without lawful authority, without process of law, and without compensation, because the President has ordered it and his officers are in possession? If such be the law of this country, it sanctions a tyranny which has no existence in the monarchies of Europe, nor in any other government which has a just claim to well-regulated liberty and the protection of personal rights.

The decision of the circuit court was affirmed.

=== Dissent ===
Associate Justice Horace Gray wrote a dissent, which was joined by Chief Justice Morrison Waite and Associate Justices Joseph P. Bradley, and William Burnham Woods.

Justice Gray extensively reviewed the facts of the case. Then Gray asserted the critical principle in the case: "The sovereign is not liable to be sued in any judicial tribunal without its consent. The sovereign cannot hold property except by agents." Like the majority, the dissenters also provided a lengthy history of the right of sovereign immunity, but underscoring the uniform inviolability of the right. Citing United States v. Clarke, 33 U.S. 436 (1834), the dissent reasserted that a lawsuit against the United States must be brought under the explicit authority of an act of Congress or the courts have no jurisdiction over it. Gray also reviewed the authority of private citizens to bring suit in the United States Court of Claims.

To permit Lee's suit, Gray argued, would open the United States to a multitude of suits over title to land it held. The cases cited by the majority (such as United States v. Peters, Osborn v. Bank of United States, Meigs v. M'Clung, and Davis v. Gray) were improperly cited, Gray argued, as in each case "either the money was in the personal possession of the defendants and not in the possession of the State, or the suit was to restrain the defendants by injunction from doing acts in violation of the Constitution of the United States." It was one thing for the Court to eject or dispossess officers or agents of the United States from land or funds; such actions, Gray concluded, continued to immunize the United States government from suits. Carr v. United States reaffirmed this principle, he concluded. To blur the distinction between officer and state or to assume or imply it without the state's consent, as the majority does, Gray said, would leave the sovereign immunity right in shambles.

Once the United States asserted that it was a party to the case, Gray concluded, the courts had no jurisdiction and should not have heard the case. Once the United States interposed itself between Kaufman and Strong and the plaintiff, the courts should not have ordered trial to proceed against them, either. Because the courts had no jurisdiction, the dissenters refused to address the issue of the validity of the title.

== Subsequent developments ==
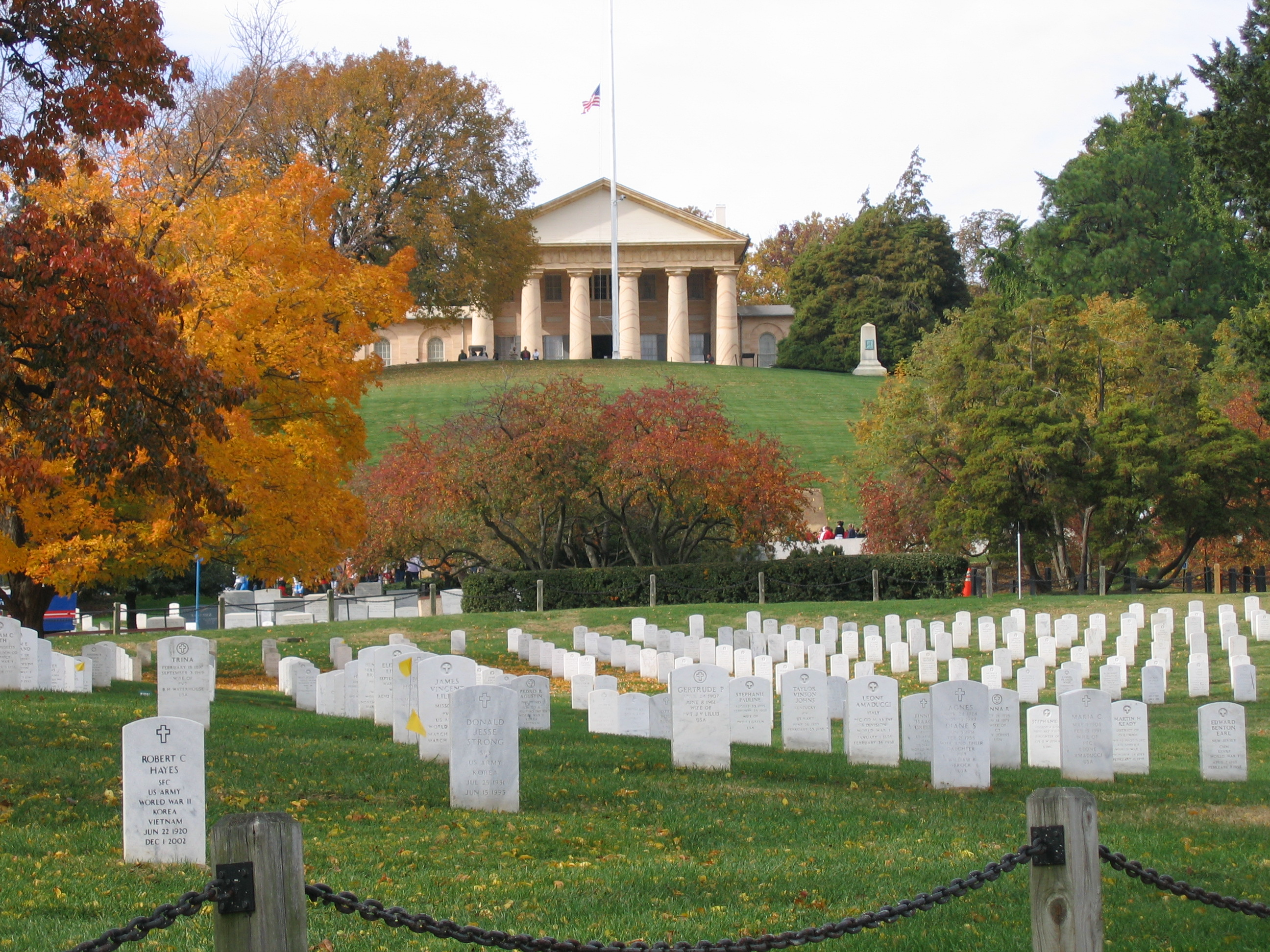
Arlington House at Arlington National Cemetery in 2005.

The U.S. government faced the daunting prospect of having to disinter 17,000 bodies and transfer Arlington back to the Lee family. Additionally, much of the estate had been developed into the new Army post of Fort Myer, which would require demolition to also be transferred back. However, Lee was less interested in regaining the estate; he wanted cash compensation for its value.

After several months of difficult negotiations, Lee and the government settled on a sale price of $150,000 ($5,183,036 in 2025 dollars). Congress enacted legislation funding the purchase on March 3, 1883; Lee signed over the title on March 31; and the title transfer was recorded on May 14, 1883. As part of the deal, Lee relinquished any claims to the estate for himself and his family.

United States v. Lee is one of three important federal sovereign immunity cases, and the most important doctrinally. The case showed just how sharply divided the Supreme Court was over the scope and legitimacy of sovereign immunity in the United States. The majority opinion questioned whether sovereign immunity was appropriate in a republic, and suggested that it had been adopted in an unprincipled and careless way by previous court decisions. The decision was the first to refuse to extend sovereign immunity to officers of the state acting as individuals, a principle which would later become known as the "stripping doctrine". The decision also revised the Supreme Court's "nominal party rule," first enunciated in Osborn and Davis. In those cases, the Court had salvaged federal and state sovereign immunity by creating a bright-line legal fiction that the suits were against government officers in their capacity as individuals and not acting on behalf of the state. The Court in Lee reaffirmed this "nominal party rule" but only with five votes—which proved to be the last time it was invoked. In Louisiana ex rel. Elliot v. Jumel, 107 U.S. 711 (1882), a majority of the Court upheld the "nominal party rule" but refused to invoke it on a technicality. In New Hampshire v. Louisiana, 108 U.S. 76 (1883), the Court abandoned the "nominal party rule" in favor of a "real party interest test." The Court openly rejected the rule (without necessarily overturning its previous decision) in In re Ayers, 123 U.S. 443 (1887). Nevertheless, the Court did not overturn Lee but rather distinguished it narrowly and continued to affirm its basic principles in Jumel and Ayers.

United States v. Lee also sharply limited the sovereign immunity doctrine by implying that it could be subordinated to other, more fundamental rights such as the Fifth Amendment's prohibition against "takings" without just compensation and due process. Justice Miller's ringing endorsement of the rights of individuals is seen as endorsing the concept that, in the United States, the people are the sovereign—not the government. In Tindal v. Wesley, 167 U.S. 204 (1897), the Supreme Court expressly extended the Lee decision to "takings" suits against states (which had previously been barred by the Court's constitutional interpretations).

Although Lee seemed to invite a full-scale reconsideration of the doctrine of sovereign immunity, subsequent Supreme Court decisions in Larson v. Domestic & Foreign Commerce Corporation, 337 U.S. 682 (1949) and Malone v. Bowdoin, 369 U.S. 643 (1962) sharply limited the impact of the Lee Court's decision. Larson and Malone specifically carved out only two areas in which an officer of the United States may be sued: 1) If the officer acts outside her or his legally prescribed scope of authority, or 2) If the officer acts in a way that is unconstitutional.

At least one legal historian has concluded that Lee also laid an early foundation for the doctrine of executive immunity.

In many ways, the Lee decision is also more famous for its defense of the rights of citizens than its sovereign immunity jurisprudence. Miller's defense of the rights of the individual ("No man...is above the law...") is considered "elegantly elaborated" by lawyer Lawrence Walsh. Constitutional law scholar Louise Weinberg called the language "ringing". Another legal scholar called the language "remarkable" and emphatic.

== Bibliography ==
- Amar, Akhil Reed. "Of Sovereignty and Federalism." Yale Law Journal. 96:1425 (June 1987).
- "Arlington." Encyclopedia of the American Civil War: A Political, Social, and Military History. David Stephen Heidler, Jeanne T. Heidler, and David J. Coles, eds. New York: W.W. Norton & Co., 2000.
- "Arlington National Cemetery." In Encyclopedia of the Veteran in America. William Pencak, ed. Santa Barbara, Calif.: ABC-CLIO, 2009.
- Atkinson, Rick. Where Valor Rests: Arlington National Cemetery. Washington, D.C.: National Geographic Society, 2007.
- Berger, Eric. "The Collision of the Takings and State Sovereign Immunity Doctrines." Washington & Lee Law Review. 63:493 (Spring 2006).
- Chase, Enoch Aquila. "The Arlington Case: George Washington Custis Lee against the United States of America." Records of the Columbia Historical Society. 31/32: 1930.
- Durchslag, Melvyn R. State Sovereign Immunity: A Reference Guide to the United States Constitution. Westport, Conn.: Praeger, 2002.
- Grant, Eric. "A Revolutionary View of the Seventh Amendment and the Just Compensation Clause." Northwestern University Law Review. 91:144 (Fall 1996).
- Hansen, Harry. The Civil War: A History. New York: Signet, 2001.
- Holt, Dean W. American Military Cemeteries. Jefferson, N.C.: McFarland & Co., 2010.
- Jackson, Percival E. Dissent in the Supreme Court: A Chronology. Norman, Okla.: University of Oklahoma Press, 1969.
- Jacobs, Clyde Edward. The Eleventh Amendment and Sovereign Immunity. Westport, Conn.: Greenwood Press, 1972.
- Jaffee, Louis L. "Suits Against Governments and Officers: Sovereign Immunity." Harvard Law Review. 77:1 (1963).
- McCaslin, Richard B. Lee in the Shadow of Washington. Baton Rouge: Louisiana State University Press, 2004.
- Meyer, Randy L. "The Supreme Court's Analysis in Idaho v. Coeur D'Alene Tribe of Idaho: Is the Young Exception to the Eleventh Amendment Inapplicable to Indian Tribe Claims?" Toledo Law Review. 30:131 (Fall 1998).
- Paust, Jordan J. "Non-Extraterritoriality of 'Special Territorial Jurisdiction' of the United States: Forgotten History and the Errors of Erdos." Yale Journal of International Law. 24:305 (Winter 1999).
- Pfafflin, James R. Encyclopedia of Environmental Science and Engineering. Florence, Ky.: Taylor & Francis, 1992.
- Poole, Robert M. On Hallowed Ground: The Story of Arlington National Cemetery. New York, N.Y.: Walker & Co., 2009.
- Randall, J.G. The Confiscation of Property During the Civil War. Indianapolis: Mutual Printing and Lithographing Co., 1913.
- Rosenblatt, Lauren E. "Removing the Eleventh Amendment Barrier: Defending Indian Land Title Against State Encroachment After Idaho v. Coeur d'Alene Tribe." Texas Law Review. 78:719 (February 2000).
- Seamon, Richard H. "The Asymmetry of State Sovereign Immunity." Washington Law Review. 76:1067 (October 2001).
- Seamon, Richard H. "Separation of Powers and the Separate Treatment of Contract Claims Against the Federal Government for Specific Performance." Villanova Law Review. 43:155 (1998).
- Silber, Nina. Landmarks of the Civil War. New York: Oxford University Press, 2003.
- Sisk, Gregory C.; Noone, Michael F.; Steadman, John Montague; and Lester, Urban A. Litigation With the Federal Government. 4th ed. Philadelphia, Pa.: American Law Institute, 2006.
- Stephenson, Donald Grier. The Waite Court: Justices, Rulings, and Legacy. Santa Barbara, Calif.: ABC-CLIO, 2003.
- Walsh, Lawrence E. "The Future of the Independent Counsel Law." Wisconsin Law Review. 1998:1379 (1998).
- Weinberg, Louise. "Of Sovereignty and Union: The Legends of Alden." University of Notre Dame Law Review. 76:113 (June 2001).
- Williams, Glenn T. "Temporary Immunity: Distinguishing Case Law Opinions on Executive Immunity and Privilege as the Supreme Court Tackles an Oxymoron." Nova Law Review. 21:969 (Spring 1997).

== For further reading ==
- Gaughan, Anthony J. The Last Battle of the Civil War: United States versus Lee, 1861-1883. Baton Rouge, Louisiana: Louisiana State University Press, 2011.
