= Billy Yank =

Personification of the Union during the American Civil War

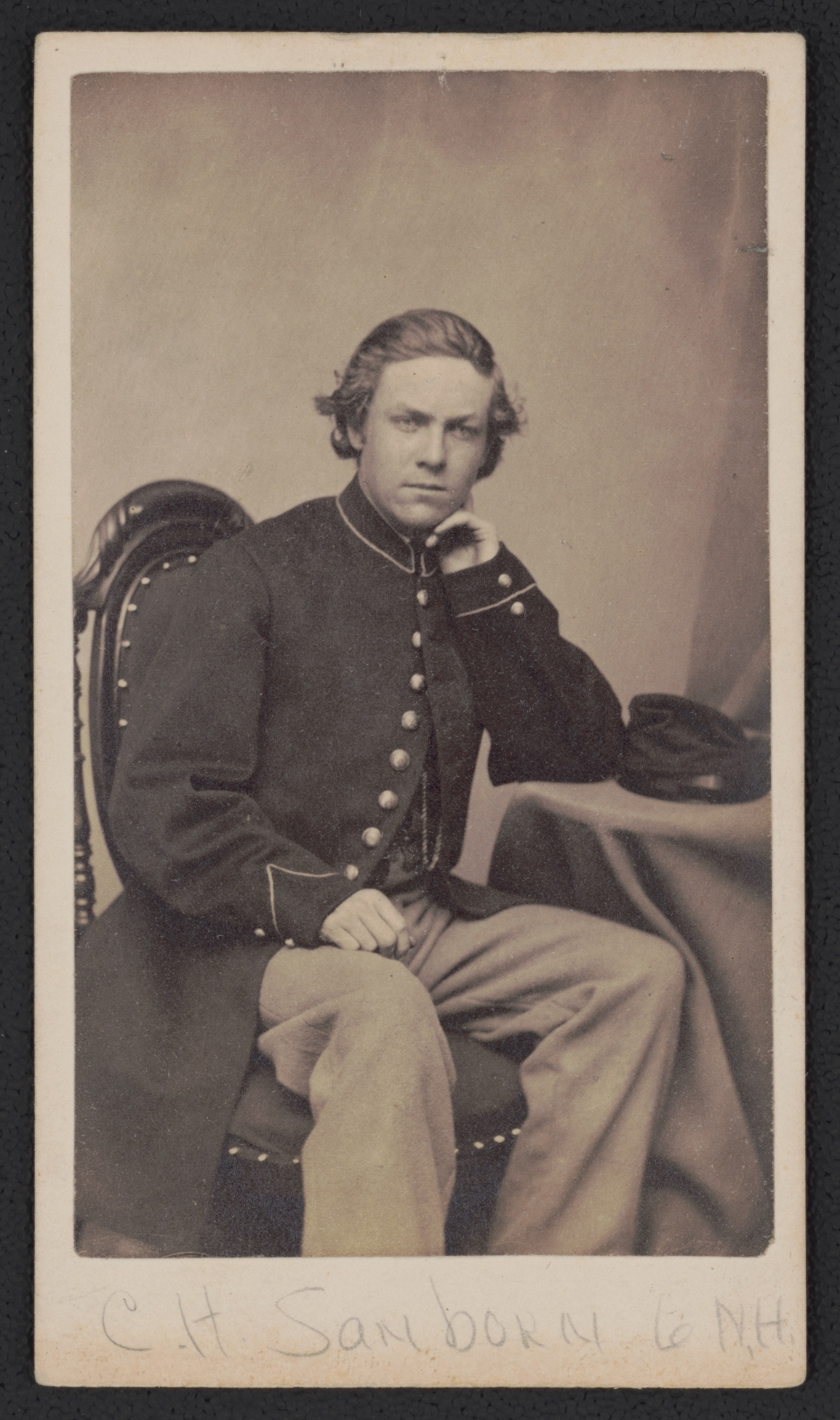
Private Charles H. Sanborn of Co. A, 6th New Hampshire Infantry Regiment

Billy Yank or Billy Yankee is the national personification of the common soldier of the Union army during the American Civil War. The latter part of the name is derived from Yankee, previously a term for New Englanders, and possibly deriving from a term for Dutch settlers of New Netherland before that, extended by American Southerners to refer to Americans from above the Mason–Dixon line (and by the British to refer to anyone from the United States). Although little evidence exists to suggest that the name was used widely during the Civil War, unlike its rebel counterpart Johnny Reb, early 20th century political cartoonists introduced 'Billy Yank' to symbolize U.S. combatants in the American Civil War of the 1860s.

Billy Yank is usually pictured wearing a regulation United States Army blue wool uniform that included the fatigue blouse, a light-weight wool coat with an inside pocket and four brass buttons on the front, with a kepi-style forage cap made of wool broadcloth with a rounded, flat top, cotton lining, and leather visor.

== See also ==
- Johnny Reb
- Johnny Reb & Billy Yank, 1905 novel
- Johnny Reb and Billy Yank (comic strip)
