= List of United States Supreme Court cases, volume 106 =

Supreme Court of the United States
- Interactive map of Supreme Court of the United States
- 38°53′26″N 77°00′16″W
- Established: March 4, 1789; 236 years ago
- Location: Washington, D.C.
- Coordinates: 38°53′26″N 77°00′16″W
- Composition method: Presidential nomination with Senate confirmation
- Authorised by: Constitution of the United States, Art. III, § 1
- Judge term length: life tenure, subject to impeachment and removal
- Number of positions: 9 (by statute)
- Website: supremecourt.gov

This is a list of cases reported in volume 106 of United States Reports, decided by the Supreme Court of the United States in 1882 and 1883.

== Justices of the Supreme Court at the time of volume 106 U.S. ==
The Supreme Court is established by Article III, Section 1 of the Constitution of the United States, which says: "The judicial Power of the United States, shall be vested in one supreme Court . . .". The size of the Court is not specified; the Constitution leaves it to Congress to set the number of justices. Under the Judiciary Act of 1789 Congress originally fixed the number of justices at six (one chief justice and five associate justices). Since 1789 Congress has varied the size of the Court from six to seven, nine, ten, and back to nine justices (always including one chief justice).

When the cases in volume 106 U.S. were decided the Court comprised the following nine members:

Portrait	Justice	Office	Home State	Succeeded	Date confirmed by the Senate (Vote)	Tenure on Supreme Court
	Morrison Waite	Chief Justice	Ohio	Salmon P. Chase	January 21, 1874 (63–0)	March 4, 1874 – March 23, 1888 (Died)
	Samuel Freeman Miller	Associate Justice	Iowa	Peter Vivian Daniel	July 16, 1862 (Acclamation)	July 21, 1862 – October 13, 1890 (Died)
	Stephen Johnson Field	Associate Justice	California	newly created seat	March 10, 1863 (Acclamation)	May 10, 1863 – December 1, 1897 (Retired)
	Joseph P. Bradley	Associate Justice	New Jersey	newly created seat	March 21, 1870 (46–9)	March 23, 1870 – January 22, 1892 (Died)
	John Marshall Harlan	Associate Justice	Kentucky	David Davis	November 29, 1877 (Acclamation)	December 10, 1877 – October 14, 1911 (Died)
	William Burnham Woods	Associate Justice	Georgia	William Strong	December 21, 1880 (39–8)	January 5, 1881 – May 14, 1887 (Died)
	Stanley Matthews	Associate Justice	Ohio	Noah Haynes Swayne	May 12, 1881 (24–23)	May 17, 1881 – March 22, 1889 (Died)
	Horace Gray	Associate Justice	Massachusetts	Nathan Clifford	December 20, 1881 (51–5)	January 9, 1882 – September 15, 1902 (Died)
	Samuel Blatchford	Associate Justice	New York	Ward Hunt	March 22, 1882 (Acclamation)	April 3, 1882 – July 7, 1893 (Died)

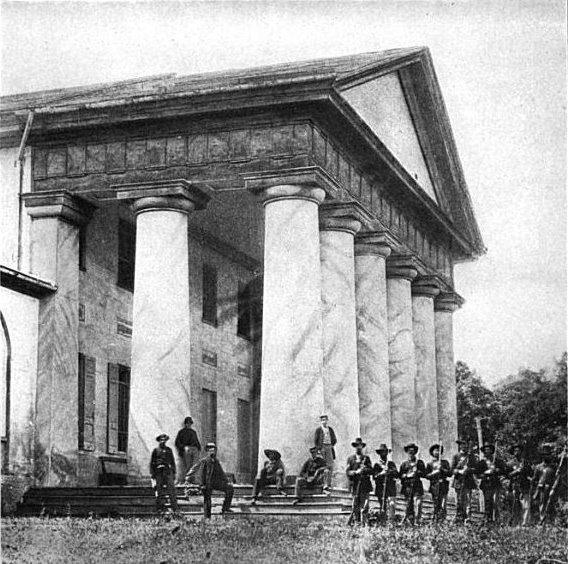
Union troops pose in front of the Lee Arlington House during the Civil War.

== Notable Cases in 106 U.S. ==
=== United States v. Lee ===
In United States v. Lee, 106 U.S. 196 (1882), the Supreme Court held that the Constitution's prohibition on lawsuits against the federal government did not extend to officers of the government themselves. The case involved the heir of Mary Anna Custis Lee, wife of Confederate States of America General Robert E. Lee, who sued to regain control of Arlington House and its grounds. Arlington had been seized by the United States government in 1861 and eventually converted into Arlington National Cemetery. The estate had been sold to pay outstanding taxes, but the Lees contested the tax sale as improper, and the Supreme Court agreed.

=== Pace v. Alabama ===
In Pace v. Alabama, 106 U.S. 583 (1883) the Supreme Court affirmed that Alabama's anti-miscegenation statute was constitutional. This ruling was rejected by the Supreme Court in 1964 in McLaughlin v. Florida and in 1967 in Loving v. Virginia.

=== United States v. Harris ===
In United States v. Harris, 106 U.S. 629 (1883) the Supreme Court held it unconstitutional for the federal government to penalize crimes such as assault and murder in most circumstances. The Court declared that only local governments have the power to penalize such crimes. In the specific case, four men were removed from a Crockett County, Tennessee, jail by a group led by Sheriff R.G. Harris and 19 others. The four men were beaten, and one was killed. A deputy sheriff tried to prevent the crime but failed. Section 2 of the Force Act of 1871 was declared unconstitutional on the ground that an Act to enforce the Equal Protection Clause applied only to state actions, not to individuals' actions.

== Citation style ==
Under the Judiciary Act of 1789 the federal court structure at the time comprised District Courts, which had general trial jurisdiction; Circuit Courts, which had mixed trial and appellate (from the US District Courts) jurisdiction; and the United States Supreme Court, which had appellate jurisdiction over the federal District and Circuit courts—and for certain issues over state courts. The Supreme Court also had limited original jurisdiction (i.e., in which cases could be filed directly with the Supreme Court without first having been heard by a lower federal or state court). There were one or more federal District Courts and/or Circuit Courts in each state, territory, or other geographical region.

Bluebook citation style is used for case names, citations, and jurisdictions.

- "C.C.D." = United States Circuit Court for the District of . . .
  - e.g.,"C.C.D.N.J." = United States Circuit Court for the District of New Jersey
- "D." = United States District Court for the District of . . .
  - e.g.,"D. Mass." = United States District Court for the District of Massachusetts
- "E." = Eastern; "M." = Middle; "N." = Northern; "S." = Southern; "W." = Western
  - e.g.,"C.C.S.D.N.Y." = United States Circuit Court for the Southern District of New York
  - e.g.,"M.D. Ala." = United States District Court for the Middle District of Alabama
- "Ct. Cl." = United States Court of Claims
- The abbreviation of a state's name alone indicates the highest appellate court in that state's judiciary at the time.
  - e.g.,"Pa." = Supreme Court of Pennsylvania
  - e.g.,"Me." = Supreme Judicial Court of Maine

== List of cases in volume 106 U.S. ==
Case Name	Page & year	Opinion of the Court	Concurring opinion(s)	Dissenting opinion(s)	Lower Court	Disposition
Parker v. Morrill	1 (1882)	Waite	none	none	C.C.D.W. Va.	dismissed
Bostwick v. Brinkerhoff	3 (1882)	Waite	none	none	N.Y.	dismissed
Ex parte Baltimore and Ohio Railroad Company	5 (1882)	Waite	none	none	C.C.D. Md.	mandamus denied
Coughlan v. District of Columbia	7 (1882)	Gray	none	none	Sup. Ct. D.C.	reversed
Bayly v. Washington and Lee University	11 (1882)	Miller	none	none	La.	affirmed
Clark v. Weeks	13 (1882)	Field	none	none	not indicated	affirmed
The New Orleans	13 (1882)	Field	none	none	C.C.S.D.N.Y.	affirmed
The North Star	17 (1882)	Bradley	none	none	C.C.S.D.N.Y.	affirmed
Phoenix Mutual Life Insurance Company v. Doster	30 (1882)	Harlan	none	none	C.C.D. Kan.	affirmed
Gosling v. Roberts	39 (1882)	Blatchford	none	none	C.C.S.D. Ohio	affirmed
Chicago and Vincennes Railroad Company v. Fosdick	47 (1882)	Matthews	none	Waite	C.C.N.D. Ill.	multiple
Equator Mining and Smelting Company v. Hall	86 (1882)	Miller	none	none	C.C.D. Colo.	reversed
American C.T. Company, Ltd. v. Simmons	89 (1882)	Blatchford	none	none	C.C.D.R.I.	reversed
Brown v. Colorado	95 (1882)	Waite	none	none	Colo.	dismissed
Bacon and B. v. Rives	99 (1882)	Harlan	none	none	C.C.W.D. Va.	reversed
Bailey v. New York Central Railroad Company	109 (1882)	Matthews	none	none	C.C.N.D.N.Y.	affirmed
National Steamship Company v. Tugman	118 (1882)	Harlan	none	none	N.Y.	reversed
Pritchard v. Norton	124 (1882)	Matthews	none	none	C.C.D. La.	reversed
Wing v. Anthony	142 (1882)	Woods	none	none	C.C.S.D.N.Y.	affirmed
Jessup v. United States	147 (1882)	Woods	none	none	C.C.D. Cal.	affirmed
The Nevada	154 (1882)	Bradley	none	none	C.C.S.D.N.Y.	affirmed
United States v. Abatoir Place	160 (1882)	Woods	none	none	C.C.S.D.N.Y.	affirmed
United States v. Frerichs	160 (1882)	Woods	none	none	C.C.S.D.N.Y.	affirmed
Mason v. Northwestern Mutual Life Insurance Company	163 (1882)	Miller	none	none	C.C.N.D. Ill.	reversed
Clough v. Barker Manufacturing Company	178 (1882)	Blatchford	none	none	C.C.S.D.N.Y.	reversed
Osborne v. Adams County	181 (1882)	Harlan	none	none	C.C.D. Neb.	affirmed
School District v. Stone	183 (1882)	Harlan	none	none	C.C.D. Iowa	reversed
Schwed v. W. Smith and Company	188 (1882)	Waite	none	none	C.C.W.D. Mo.	dismissed
Fraser v. Jennison	191 (1882)	Waite	none	none	C.C.E.D. Mich.	affirmed
United States v. Lee	196 (1882)	Miller	none	none	C.C.E.D. Va.	reversed
Richardson v. Hardwick	252 (1882)	Woods	none	none	C.C.E.D. Mich.	affirmed
Badger v. D.L. Ranlett and Company	255 (1882)	Blatchford	none	none	C.C.E.D. La.	affirmed
Wallace v. Penfield	260 (1882)	Harlan	none	none	C.C.E.D. Mo.	reversed
Farmers' Loan and Trust Company v. Waterman	265 (1882)	Waite	none	none	C.C.D. Ind.	dismissed
Fink v. O'Neil	272 (1882)	Matthews	none	none	C.C.E.D. Wis.	affirmed
Miltenberger v. Logansport et al. Railway Company	286 (1882)	Blatchford	none	none	C.C.D. Ind.	affirmed
Kirk v. Lynd	315 (1882)	Waite	none	none	C.C.E.D. La.	affirmed
S. Seymour and Company v. Western Railroad Company	320 (1882)	Gray	none	none	C.C.E.D.N.C.	reversed
Tyler v. Campbell	322 (1882)	Gray	none	Field	C.C.S.D.N.Y.	affirmed
United States v. Erie Railroad Company	327 (1882)	Waite	Bradley	Field	C.C.S.D.N.Y.	reversed
Bedford v. Burton	338 (1882)	Bradley	none	none	C.C.M.D. Tenn.	affirmed
Ames v. Quimby	342 (1882)	Blatchford	none	none	C.C.W.D. Mich.	affirmed
St. Clair v. Cox	350 (1882)	Field	none	none	C.C.E.D. Mich.	affirmed
Van Wyck v. Knevals	360 (1882)	Field	none	none	C.C.D. Neb.	affirmed
Ex parte Curtis	371 (1882)	Waite	none	Bradley	C.C.S.D.N.Y.	habeas corpus denied
Geekie v. Kirby Carpenter Company	379 (1882)	Blatchford	none	none	C.C.E.D. Wis.	reversed
Lansdale v. Smith	391 (1882)	Harlan	none	none	Sup. Ct. D.C.	affirmed
King v. Cornell	395 (1882)	Waite	none	none	C.C.N.D.N.Y.	affirmed
Hemingway v. Stansell	399 (1883)	Gray	none	none	N.D. Miss.	reversed
Hodges v. Easton	408 (1882)	Harlan	none	none	C.C.E.D. Wis.	reversed
Walker's Executors v. United States	413 (1882)	Harlan	none	none	Ct. Cl.	affirmed
Moffitt v. Rogers	423 (1882)	Woods	none	none	C.C.D. Mass.	affirmed
School District v. Hall	428 (1882)	Waite	none	none	C.C.D. Iowa	dismissal denied
Grant v. Phoenix Mutual Life Insurance Company	429 (1882)	Waite	none	none	Sup. Ct. D.C.	dismissed
Wooden Ware Company v. United States	432 (1882)	Miller	none	none	C.C.E.D. Wis.	affirmed
Grinnell M. and Company v. United States	437 (1882)	Blatchford	none	none	C.C.S.D.N.Y.	affirmed
Dodge v. Freedman's S. and T. Company	445 (1882)	Waite	none	none	Sup. Ct. D.C.	affirmed
Steel v. St. Louis S. & R. Company	447 (1882)	Field	none	none	C.C.D.C.	affirmed
Georgia v. Jesup	458 (1882)	Harlan	none	none	C.C.S.D. Ga.	affirmed
Clark v. Keith	464 (1883)	Waite	none	none	Tenn.	affirmed
Morrill v. Jones	466 (1882)	Waite	none	none	C.C.D. Me.	affirmed
Branch, Sons and Company v. Jesup	468 (1883)	Bradley	none	none	C.C.S.D. Ga.	affirmed
City of Parkersburg v. Brown	487 (1882)	Blatchford	none	none	C.C.D.W. Va.	reversed
Clarkson v. Stevens	505 (1882)	Matthews	none	none	N.J. Ch.	affirmed
Patterson v. Lynde	519 (1883)	Waite	none	none	C.C.N.D. Ill.	affirmed
Ex parte Carll	521 (1883)	Waite	none	none	not indicated	habeas corpus denied
First Nationak Bank v. Hughes	523 (1883)	Waite	none	none	C.C.N.D. Ohio	dismissed
United States v. Stone	525 (1882)	Matthews	none	none	N.D. Miss.	affirmed
Shelton v. Van Kleeck	532 (1883)	Waite	none	none	C.C.N.D. Ill.	affirmed
United States v. Denvir	536 (1883)	Miller	none	none	C.C.D. Mass.	affirmed
City of Detroit v. Dean	537 (1883)	Field	none	none	C.C.E.D. Mich.	affirmed
Miller v. National Bank	542 (1883)	Waite	none	none	Ky.	dismissed
Pierce, S. and Company. v. Indseth	546 (1883)	Field	none	none	C.C.D. Minn.	affirmed
Turner Brothers v. Farmers' Loan and Trust Company	552 (1883)	Harlan	none	none	C.C.S.D. Ill.	affirmed
Merchants' and Manufacturers' National Bank of Pittsburgh v. Slagle	558 (1882)	Miller	none	none	C.C.W.D. Pa.	affirmed
City of Savannah v. Jesup	563 (1883)	Harlan	none	Miller	C.C.S.D. Ga.	affirmed
Jenkins v. International Bank	571 (1883)	Miller	none	none	Ill.	affirmed
Adams v. Crittenden	576 (1882)	Waite	none	none	C.C.N.D. Ala.	dismissed
Town of Elgin v. Marshall	578 (1883)	Matthews	none	none	C.C.D. Minn.	dismissed
Pace v. Alabama	583 (1883)	Field	none	none	Ala.	affirmed
Hayden v. Manning	586 (1883)	Miller	none	none	C.C.D. Or.	reversed
Town of Thompson v. Perrine	589 (1883)	Harlan	none	none	C.C.S.D.N.Y.	affirmed
Pray v. United States	594 (1883)	Miller	none	none	Ct. Cl.	affirmed
Town of Red Rock v. Henby	596 (1883)	Woods	none	none	C.C.D. Minn.	affirmed
Weeth v. New England Mortgage Company	605 (1882)	Waite	none	none	C.C.D. Neb.	dismissed
Porter v. United States	607 (1883)	Field	none	none	Sup. Ct. D.C.	affirmed
Albright v. Teas	613 (1883)	Woods	none	none	C.C.D.N.J.	affirmed
United States v. Wilson	620 (1883)	Waite	none	none	C.C.M.D. Tenn.	affirmed
Madison County v. Warren	622 (1883)	Waite	none	none	C.C.S.D. Ill.	affirmed
Russell v. Williams & H.	623 (1882)	Bradley	none	none	C.C.D. Mass.	reversed
United States v. Harris	629 (1883)	Woods	none	none	C.C.W.D. Tenn.	certification
Rogers v. Durant	644 (1883)	Gray	none	none	C.C.N.D. Ill.	reversed
The Sterling	647 (1882)	Waite	none	none	C.C.D. La.	reversed
Fitzpatrick Brothers v. C.M. and G.M. Flannagan	648 (1882)	Matthews	none	none	C.C.S.D. Miss.	multiple
McGinty v. C.M. and G.M. Flannagan	661 (1882)	Matthews	none	none	C.C.S.D. Miss.	reversed
Chickaming Township v. Carpenter	663 (1883)	Waite	none	none	C.C.W.D. Mich.	affirmed
Kankakee County v. Aetna Life Insurance Company	668 (1883)	Matthews	none	none	C.C.N.D. Ill.	affirmed
Hayward v. Andrews	672 (1883)	Matthews	none	none	C.C.N.D. Ill.	affirmed
Gay v. Parpart	679 (1883)	Miller	none	none	C.C.N.D.N.Y.	affirmed
Grand Trunk Railway Company v. Cummings	700 (1883)	Waite	none	none	C.C.D. Me.	affirmed
