= Abingdon (plantation) =

Plantation site in Virginia, United States of America

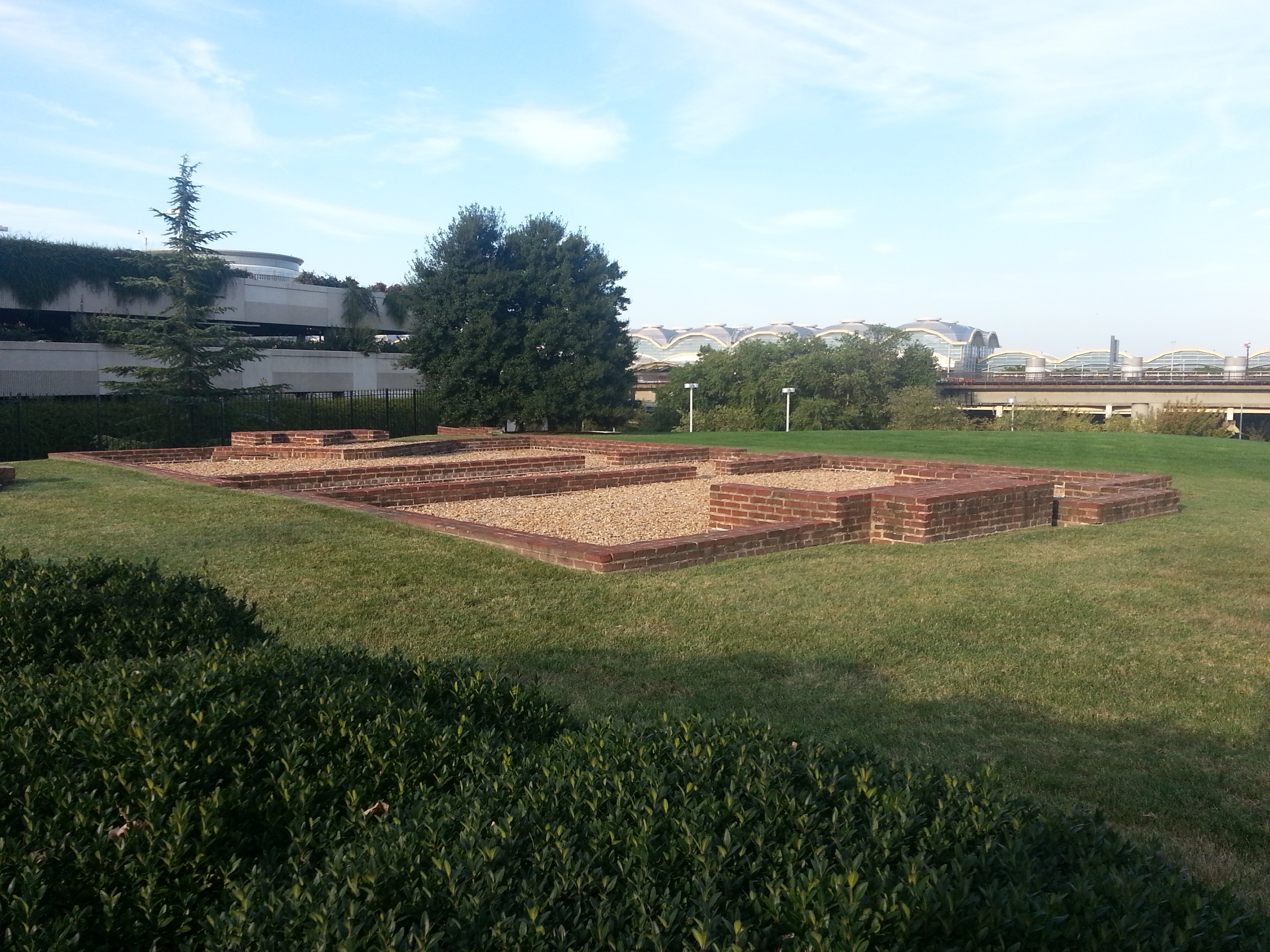
- Reconstructed Abingdon house foundation (2014)
- Alternative names: Abingdon Plantation; Alexander-Custis Plantation

General information
- Type: Private residence
- Architectural style: Georgian
- Location: Ronald Reagan Washington National Airport, Arlington County, Virginia, United States
- Coordinates: 38°51′05″N 77°02′40″W
- Completed: by 1746 (first building)
- Destroyed: 1930
- Owner: Gerard Alexander I Robert Alexander; John Parke Custis; Dr. David Stuart; Walter Alexander; General Alexander Hunter; Alexander Hunter (2nd); Alfred Richards Brick Company; New Washington Brick Company; Richmond, Fredericksburg and Potomac Railroad; United States government Metropolitan Washington Airports Authority

Abingdon (also known as the Alexander-Custis Plantation) was an 18th- and 19th-century plantation owned by the prominent Alexander, Custis, Stuart, and Hunter families and worked at times by slaves and domesticated animals. The plantation's site is now located in Arlington County in the U.S. state of Virginia.

Abingdon is known as the birthplace of Eleanor "Nelly" Parke Custis Lewis (March 31, 1779 – July 15, 1852), a granddaughter of Martha Washington and a step-granddaughter of United States President George Washington. Published accounts have credited Abingdon as being the home to the progenitor of all weeping willows (Salix babylonica) living in the United States. Ronald Reagan Washington National Airport, which occupies part of Abingdon's grounds, contains indoor and outdoor displays that commemorate the plantation's history.

== History ==
=== Alexander family ===
The land that contains Abingdon was originally part of a larger holding granted in 1669 by letters patent to shipmaster Robert Howson for headrights for settlers that he had brought to the Colony of Virginia. Howson soon sold the patent to John Alexander for 6,000 pounds of tobacco.

Alexander was a descendant of the MacDonald clan of Scotland and was a son of the Earl of Stirling. He immigrated to Virginia around 1653, settled in Stafford County and became a planter, surveyor and captain of the Stafford County militia.

When Alexander purchased the Howson patent, the patent covered an 8,000-acre (3,200 ha) site (believed at the time of sale to contain only 6,000 acres (2,400 ha)) on the southwestern side of the Potomac River. The site was about 2 miles (3.2 km) wide and extended along the Potomac from Hunting Creek (the southern boundary of the present City of Alexandria) to the present northern boundary of Arlington National Cemetery.

After John Alexander's death in 1677, one of his sons, Robert Alexander, acquired the Howson patent by inheritance and by a gift from his brother, Phillip Alexander. In 1735, Gerrard Alexander, a grandson of Robert Alexander, inherited the northern part of the Howson patent. In 1746, a survey map that Daniel Jennings prepared showed that Gerrard Alexander owned a house on a portion of the Howson patent that was north of Four Mile Creek.

Shortly thereafter, the town of Alexandria was chartered in 1749 on a more southerly part of the Howson patent. The town was named in honor of John Alexander and his family, who provided land on which the town was founded.

In 1760, the plantation housed 24 slaves who maintained crops and livestock on its waterfront property. After Gerrard Alexander's death in 1761, his three sons, Robert, Phillip and Gerrard (2nd), each inherited approximately 900 acres (364 ha) of his estate.

=== Custis and Stuart families ===
In 1778, John Parke Custis (nicknamed "Jacky"), the son of Daniel Parke Custis and Martha Washington and the stepson of George Washington, purchased Abingdon and its 900-acre (364 ha) estate from Robert Alexander. Custis had been eager to obtain real estate in the Abingdon area on which to raise his family.

However, Jacky Custis' eagerness and inexperience allowed Robert Alexander to take advantage of him in the transaction, because compound interest during the 24-year term would eventually transform the £12,000 purchase price into payments totalling over £48,000. (Some sources claim that General George Washington purchased Abingdon for Custis.) When he learned of the terms of the purchase, Washington informed Custis that "No Virginia Estate (except a few under the best management) can stand simple Interest how then can they bear compound Interest".

Jacky Custis chose Abingdon because it was equidistant between the Washingtons' home at Mount Vernon, and the family home of his wife, Eleanor Calvert (the Mount Airy estate, whose restored mansion is now in Rosaryville State Park in Prince George's County, Maryland). Eleanor Calvert was a descendant of Cecilius Calvert, second Lord Baltimore, a member of the Parliament of England and the recipient of the charter for the Maryland colony.

During the year (1778) that Jacky Custis purchased Abingdon, his neighbors in Fairfax County elected him to the Virginia General Assembly as a delegate. Shortly after moving to Abingdon, Custis' wife gave birth to their third surviving daughter, Eleanor (Nelly) Parke Custis on March 31, 1779. Nelly, her older sisters, Elizabeth (Eliza) Parke Custis and Martha Parke Custis Peter, and her younger brother, George Washington Parke Custis (G.W.P. Custis), were then raised at Abingdon.

However, Jacky Custis contracted "camp fever" in 1781 at the Siege of Yorktown while serving as Washington's aide and died shortly after Cornwallis surrendered there. Soon afterwards, George Washington "adopted" the two youngest Custis children, Nelly and George, who moved from Abingdon to live with the Washingtons at Mount Vernon. The eldest children, Elizabeth and Martha, remained at Abingdon.

Custis' widow, Eleanor, remarried in the autumn of 1783 to a friend and business associate of George Washington, Dr. David Stuart. During the period that Dr. Stuart and Eleanor resided at Abingdon, Dr. Stuart served as a delegate from Fairfax County in the Virginia General Assembly and President Washington appointed him to be one of the three commissioners that oversaw planning of the nation's new capital city.

In 1791, Dr. Stuart and the two other commissioners named the new capital the "City of Washington" in "The Territory of Columbia" (see: History of Washington, D.C.). Dr. Stuart and his wife had sixteen children, at least three of whom (Anne Calvert Stuart, Sarah Stuart and Ariana Calvert Stuart) were born at Abingdon.

Although John Parke Custis had become well-established at Abingdon, his financial matters were in a state of disarray due to his poor business judgement and wartime taxation. After his death in 1781, it took the administrators of the Custis Estate more than a decade to negotiate an end to the transaction through which Custis had purchased Abingdon.

Because the estate had been paid for with Continental currency, the heirs of Gerrard Alexander brought suit against the Custis and Stuart families to recover their money. After years of litigation, Abingdon was returned to Robert Alexander in 1792.

After Robert Alexander died in 1793, court-appointed commissioners surveyed his 1,090-acre (440 ha) estate and divided it equally between two of his sons, Robert and Walter. In 1800, Walter Alexander obtained ownership of the southern half of the estate, which contained the 545 acres (221 ha) on which the Abingdon house stood.

In 1805, George Wise acquired a portion of Abingdon that included the house. Others acquired different parts of Walter Alexander's Abingdon property. The Wise family lived at Abingdon until "General" Alexander Hunter acquired 99 acres (40 ha) of the Abingdon property from George Wise and others between 1835 and 1842.

At the same time that John Parke Custis purchased Abingdon from Robert Alexander, he also purchased outright a 1,100-acre (450 ha) tract of land from Gerrard Alexander (2nd). This more northerly tract, which was separated from Abingdon by the 900-acre (364 ha) tract that Phillip Alexander had inherited, remained in the possession of the Custis family. G.W.P. Custis, who inherited this land from his father (John Parke Custis) later constructed and named Arlington House on a plantation that he developed on the tract.

==== Gallery of the Custis family ====
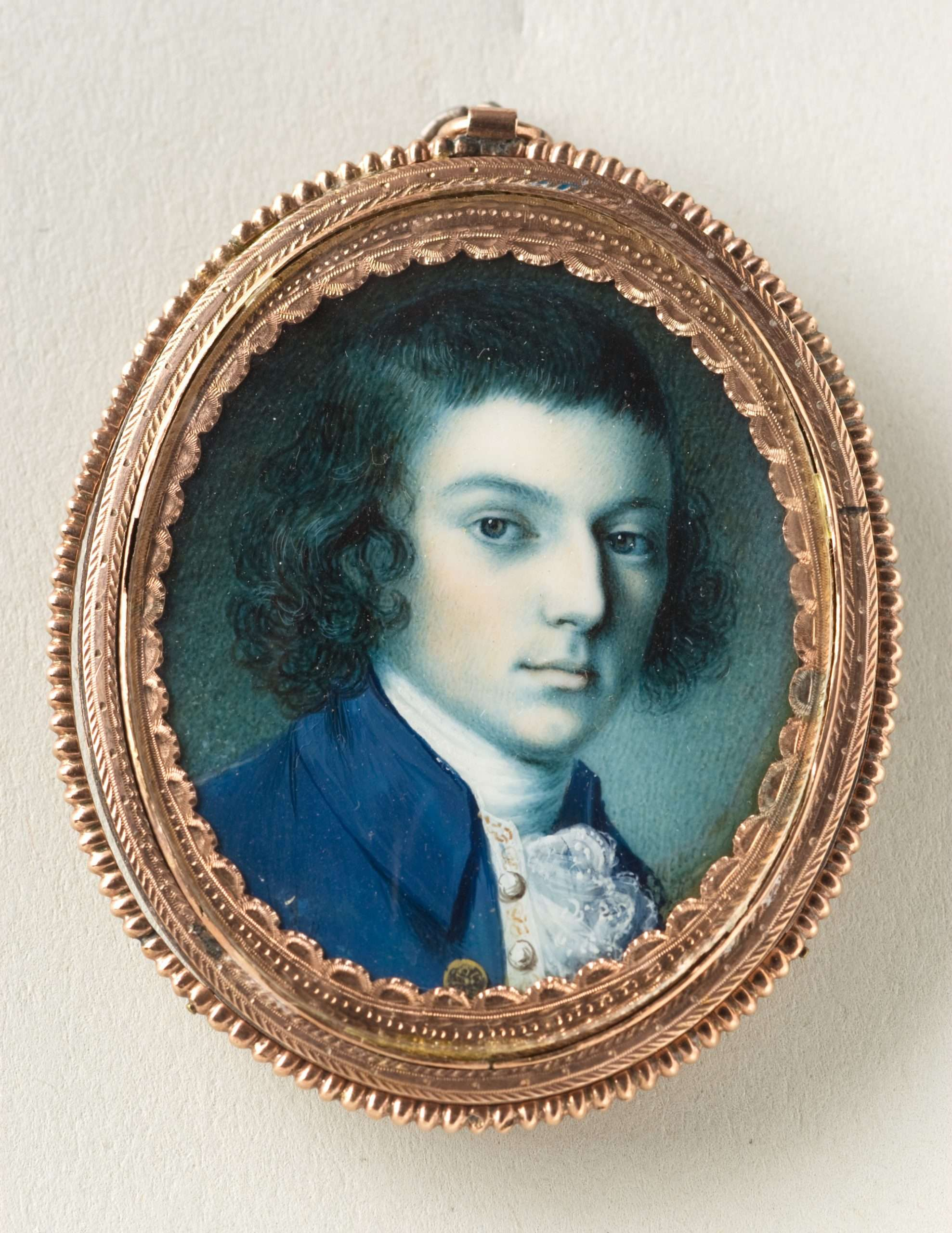
^{
Mount Vernon Ladies' Association
}
Portrait of John (Jacky) Parke Custis by Charles Willson Peale (ca. 1774)

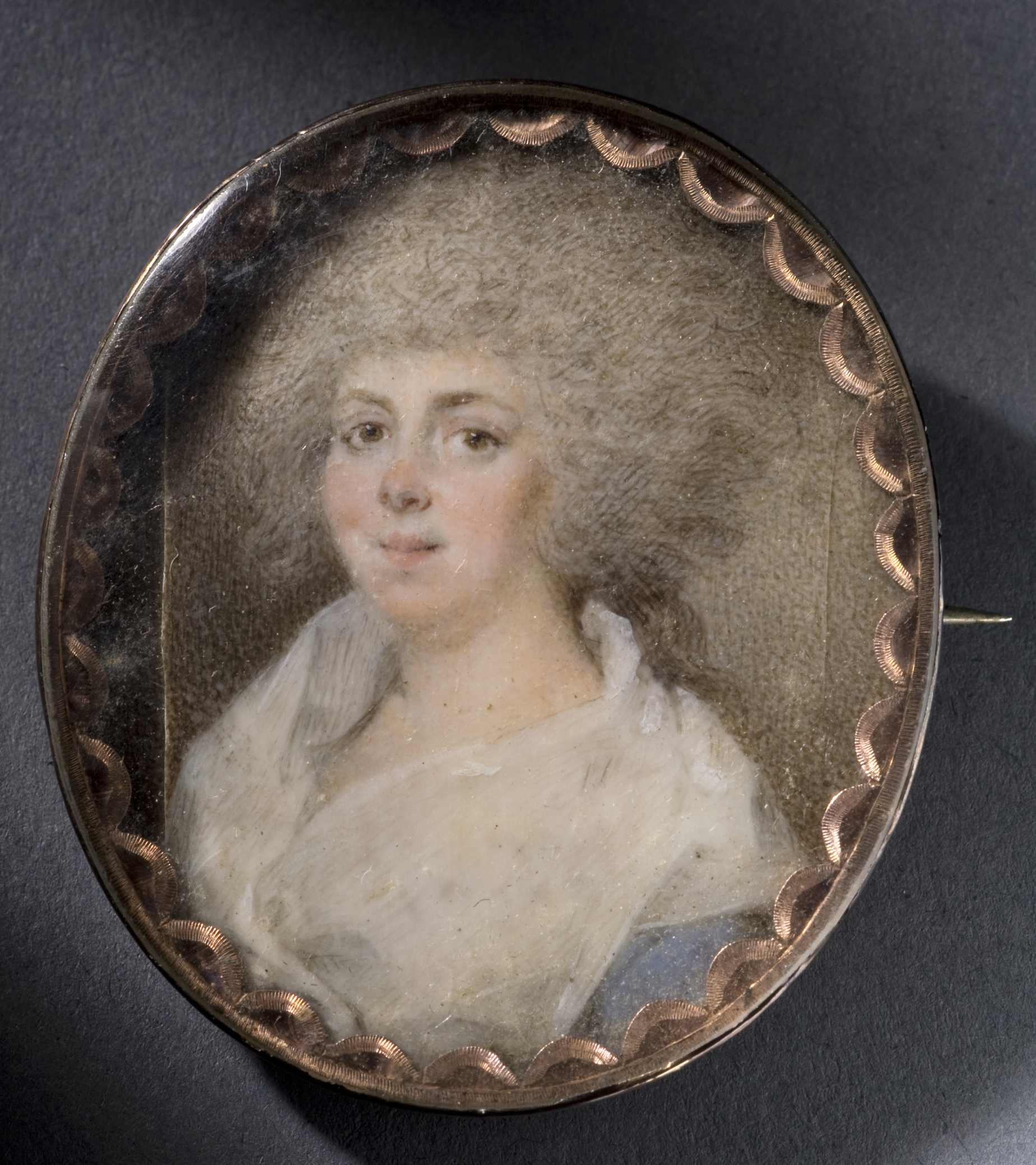
Portrait of Eleanor Calvert Custis (ca. 1780)

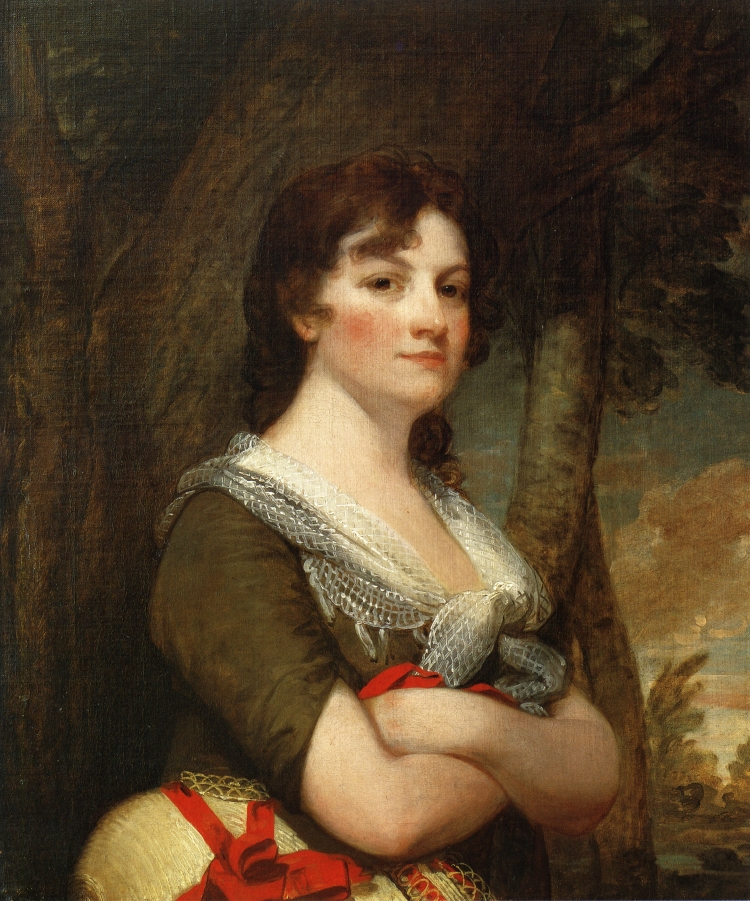
^{
Mount Vernon Ladies' Association
}
Portrait of Elizabeth (Eliza) Parke Custis by Sarah Miriam Peale (1836), after a 1796 painting by Gilbert Stuart

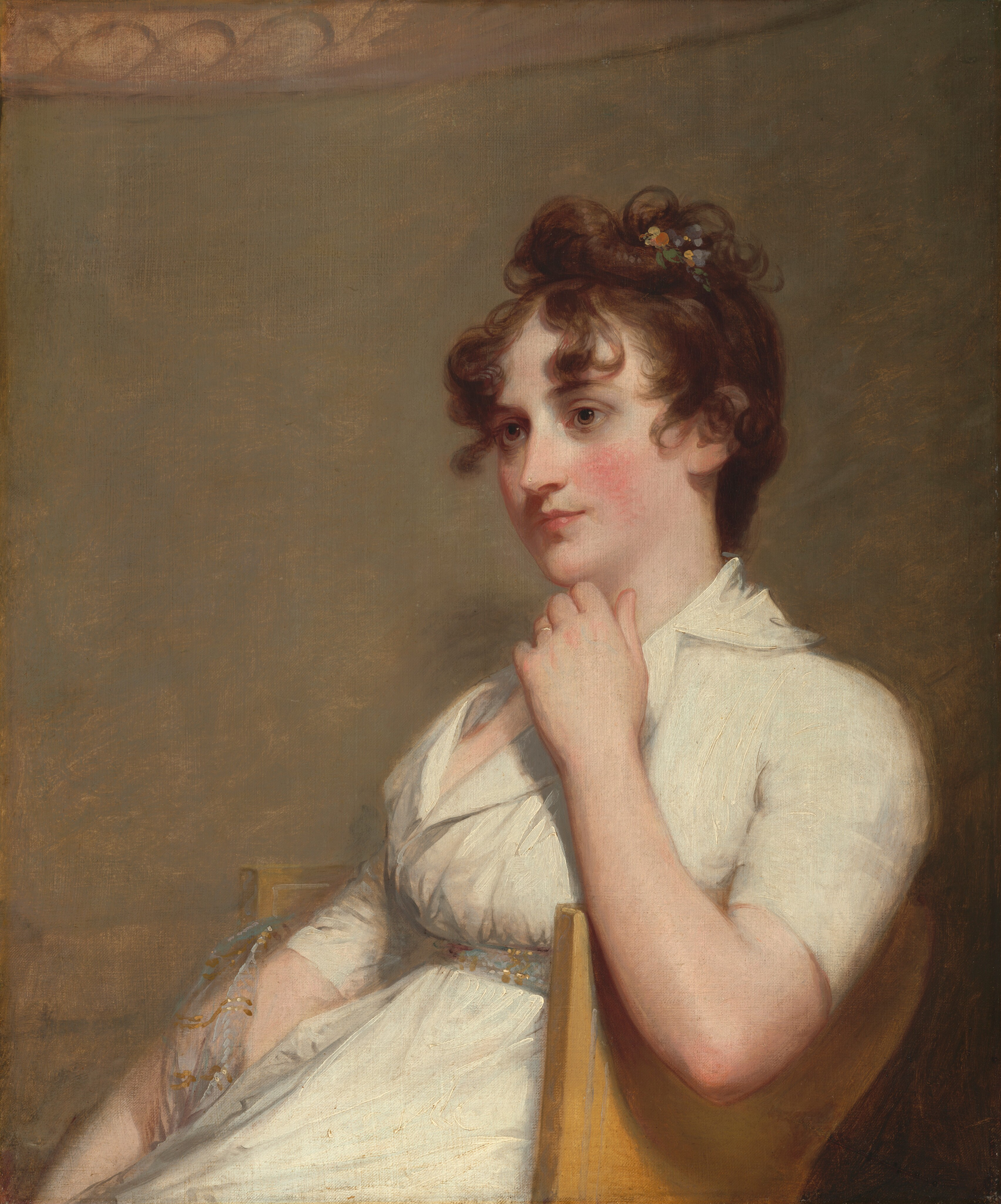
^{
National Gallery of Art
}
Portrait of Eleanor (Nelly) Parke Custis
by Gilbert Stuart (1804)

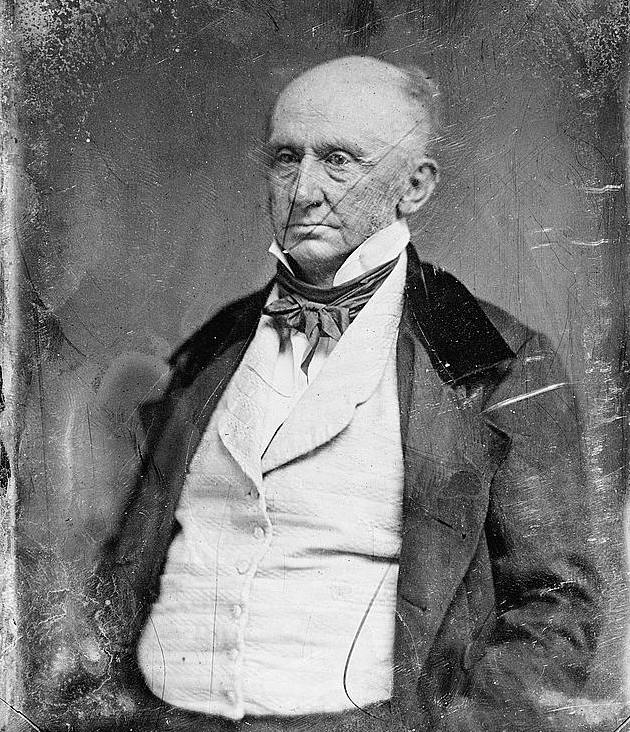
^{
Library of Congress
}
George Washington Parke Custis (Daguerreotype by Mathew Brady between 1844 and 1849)

==== Weeping willow ====
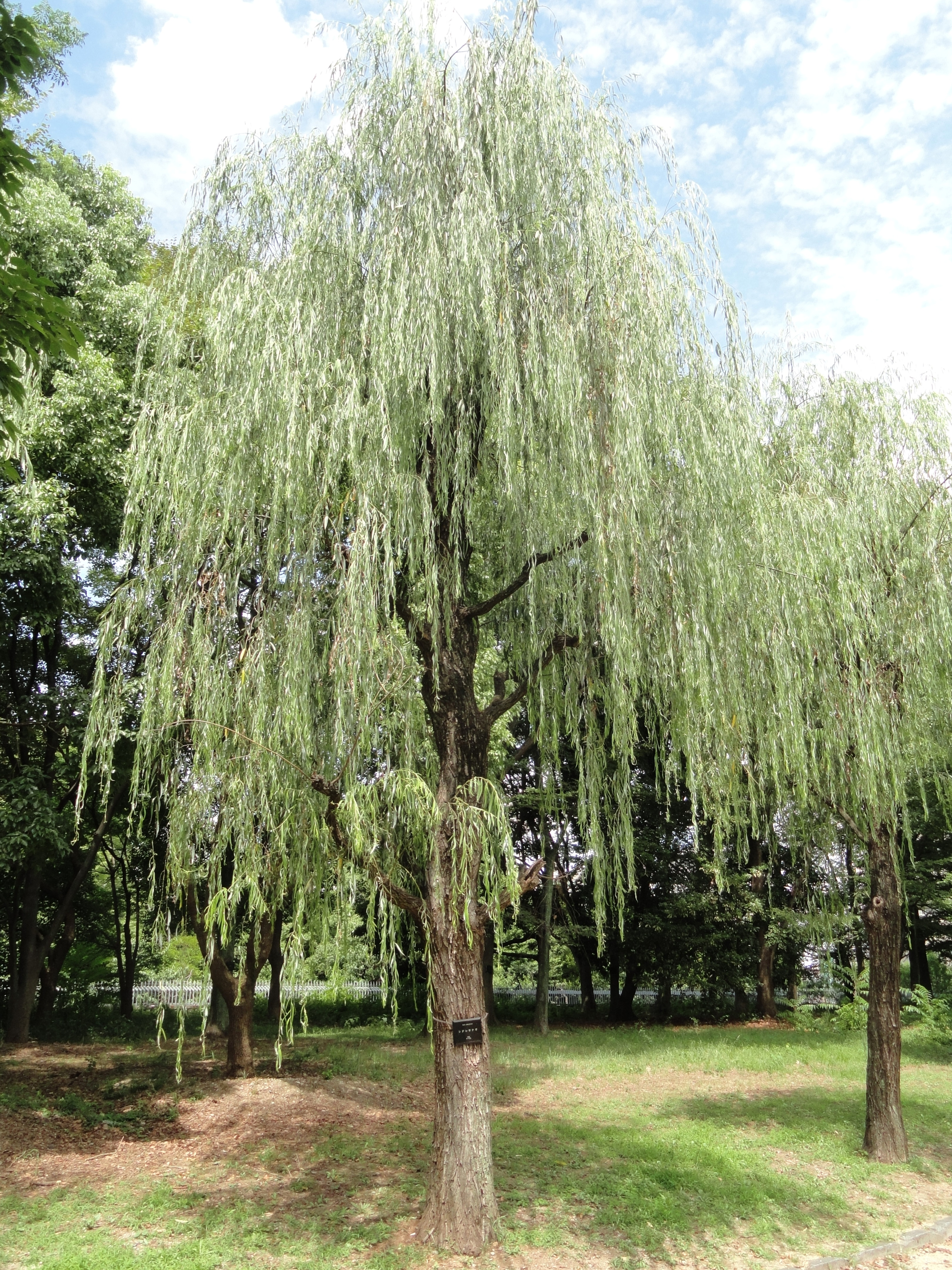
^{ Nagai Botanical Garden, Osaka, Japan } Weeping willow (Salix babylonica) (2012)

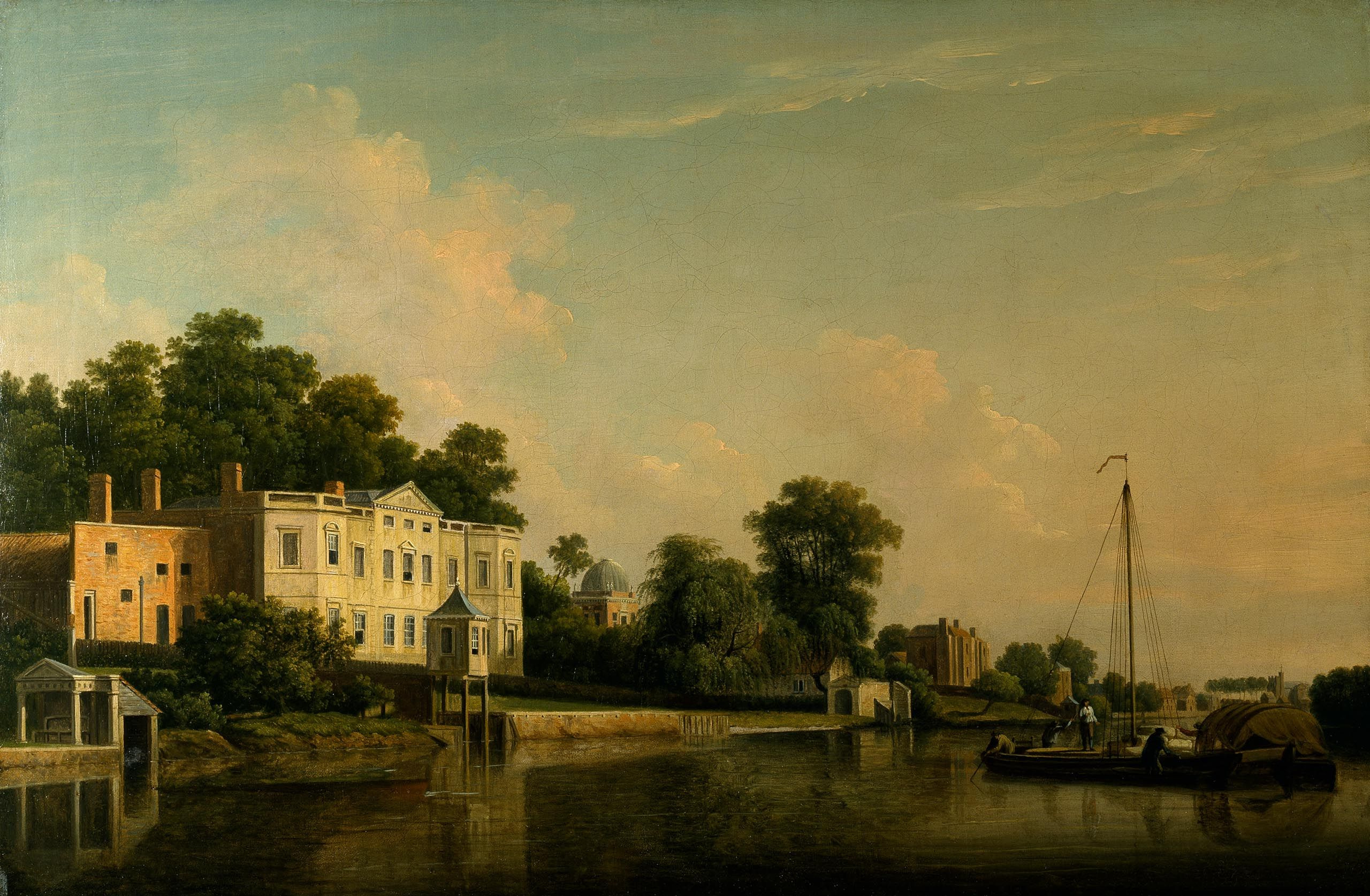
^{ Denver Art Museum } A View of Alexander Pope's Villa, Twickenham by Samuel Scott (ca. 1759)

According to accounts that historian Benson J. Lossing and others wrote in the mid- to late 1800s and early 1900s that were based on a story that G.W.P. Custis had told to Lossing, John Parke Custis served on George Washington's staff during the Siege of Boston in 1775-1776 and became an emissary to the British forces there. According to these accounts, Custis befriended a young British officer on the staff of General William Howe, 5th Viscount Howe. While in Cambridge, Massachusetts, the officer gave Custis a weeping willow (Salix babylonica) twig that the officer had taken from a famous tree that Alexander Pope had planted at Twickenham and that was first of its kind in England.

The officer had intended to plant his willow sprig wrapped in oiled silk along a stream on land he would seize from the Americans. However, following his army's defeat, he decided to give the sprig to Custis.

Custis then planted the twig at Abingdon. The resulting tree reportedly became the progenitor of all of the weeping willows growing in the United States at the time of the accounts.

One such tree reportedly grew next to Arlington National Cemetery near the northern end of George Washington Parke Custis' mansion, Arlington House. Another reportedly grew from a slip of the Abingdon willow that American General Horatio Gates had planted at the entrance to his Rose Hill Farm in Manhattan. That tree, which became known as "Gates's Willow", grew at a site that became the corner of Third Avenue and 22nd Street. The tree was reportedly cut down in 1860.

However, two 1840 newspaper articles that related G.W.P. Custis' account of the origins of the tree then standing near Arlington House said that John Parke Custis had planted the Twickenham willow twig "on the banks of the Potomac", but had not identified Abingdon as the specific location of the planting. 21st-century writers have questioned the veracity of such accounts.

=== Hunter family ===
"General" Alexander Hunter, a descendant of the Alexander family who had served at the Battle of Bladensburg during the War of 1812 as Adjutant of the District of Columbia Regiment of Volunteers, acquired Abingdon from the Wise family and others. Hunter was a wealthy man who held a position in Alexandria's custom house and reportedly spent lavishly to renovate and beautify his house and estate at Abingdon.

As U.S. Marshal for the District of Columbia, Hunter was a friend of United States President Andrew Jackson. Jackson frequently left Washington City to spend Sundays at Abingdon as Hunter's guest. Hunter reportedly had an inflexible rule that forbade office-seeking and discussions of politics during Jackson's visits. In addition to President Jackson, Hunter also hosted Presidents John Tyler and James K. Polk at Abingdon.

A chamber on the northeast side of the Abingdon house was referred to as "General Washington's room" during Hunter's ownership because George Washington had usually occupied this room while visiting his stepson, John Parke Custis. Some authors later stated that Hunter had told visitors that he chose not to build a more pretentious structure because a house that was good enough for Washington was good enough for him.

"General" Hunter died in 1849. According to an 1850 inventory of his estate, the plantation held at the time five cows, four bulls, at least six calves, two carriage horses, two sows, 27 hogs, numerous plows, a wagon, two carts, a blacksmith iron (anvil) with tools, the main house, a barn, five or six slave cabins and 22 slaves aged two to 70 years that together had a value of $5,035.00 (worth $194,855 in 2021). The inventory listed the cattle and horses as being worth $1,209.50 (worth $46,808 in 2021) and the value of Abingdon's furniture, implements and produce (including pillowcases, candles, pots, kettles, ironware, pieces of china, tools, andirons, a mahogany bookcase, a spinning wheel, barometers, a fishing rod, a waffle iron and 159 barrels of corn) at $1,459.99 (worth $56,502 in 2021).

The main house contained upstairs bedrooms, a wash room, a storage room, a kitchen, a dining room, and a breakfast room that held a walnut table, a stove and a copper tea kettle. A large cellar lay beneath the first floor.

Hunter entrusted Abingdon to his brother Bushrod Washington Hunter, until Bushrod's son, also named Alexander Hunter, could come of age. Bushrod Hunter had earlier served as a lieutenant in the United States Navy in 1846 during the Mexican–American War. In 1857, Bushrod Hunter served as a pallbearer at the funeral service for G.W.P. Custis, whose house at the "Arlington Plantation" was not far from Abingdon.

=== American Civil War ===
When the American Civil War began in 1861, Bushrod and Alexander Hunter (2nd) left the Abingdon plantation to join Confederate forces. During the war, a New Jersey regiment of the Union Army occupied the plantation, calling it "Camp Princeton".

In 1862, the 37th United States Congress enacted "An act for the collection of the direct tax in insurrectionary districts within the United States and for other purposes". In 1864, United States Tax Commissioners confiscated Abingdon and the nearby "Arlington Plantation" under provisions of this act after the owners of each property failed to pay their taxes in person. (A tenant had offered to pay Abingdon's taxes on behalf of the property owner (Bushrod Hunter). However, the government's tax collector refused to accept the payment.)

The government then sold the Abingdon property to Lucius E. Chittenden, Register of the Treasury in the Abraham Lincoln administration. Chittenden then leased the property to Henry M. Bennett.

In 1904, Alexander Hunter (2nd) authored a book (Johnny Reb and Billy Yank) in which he recorded his recollections of the Civil War and its aftermath. In his book, Hunter stated that his father (Bushrod Hunter) had removed his family to Alexandria and in April 1861 had abandoned Abingdon. He wrote of Abingdon, whose structures and landscaping were apparently destroyed during the war:

We lived on a splendid estate of 650 acres, lying on the Potomac, between Alexandria and Washington. I doubt whether in the whole Southland there had existed a finer country seat; the house was built solidly, as if to defy time itself, with its beautiful trees, fine orchards, its terraced lawns, graveled walks leading to the river a quarter of a mile away; the splendid barns, the stables with fine horses (for which my father, a retired naval officer, had a special fondness), the servants quarters, where dwelt the old family retainers and their offspring, some fifty or more. ... The land was there after the war, but that was all.

=== Post-Civil War ===
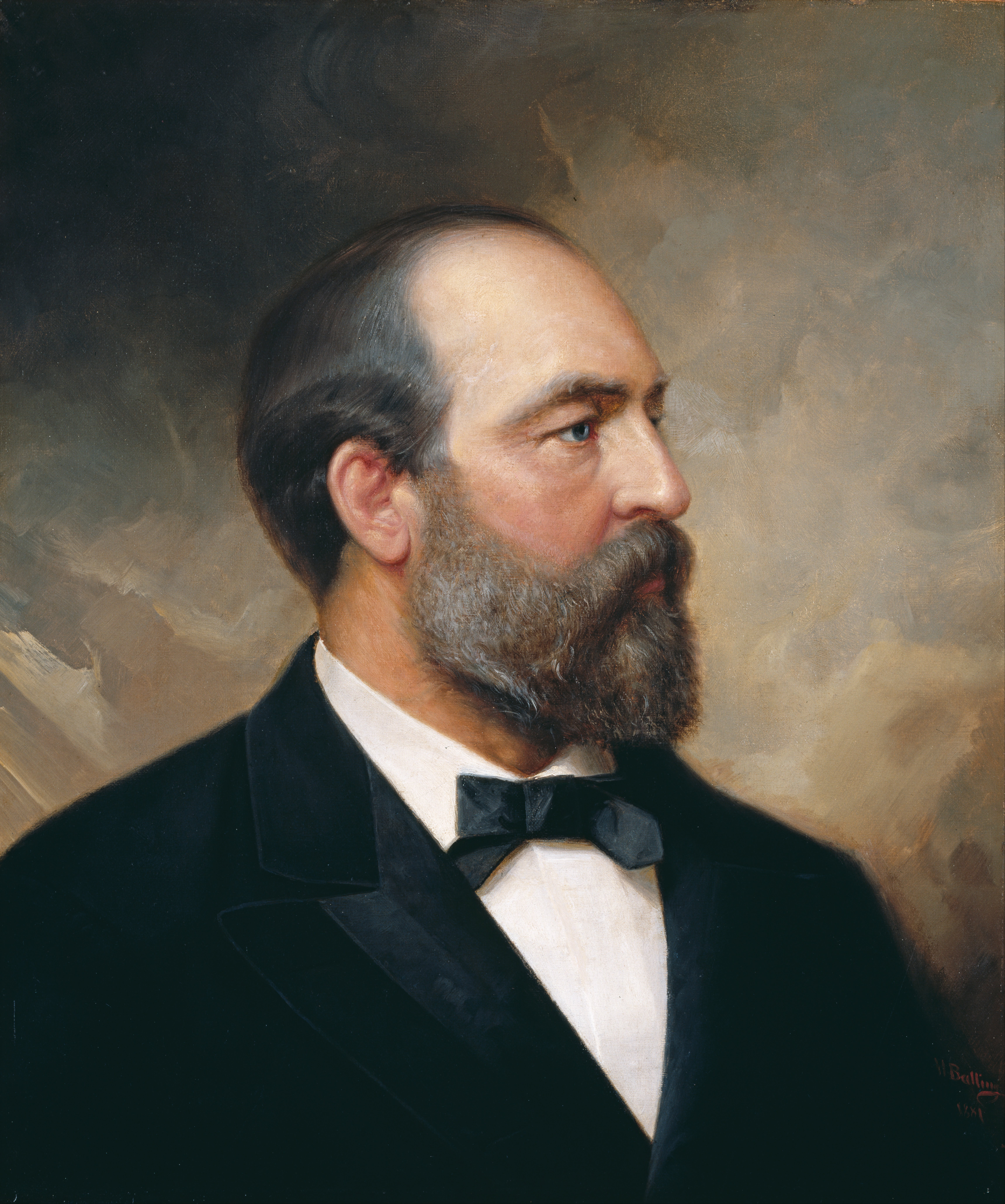
^{National Gallery of Art} Portrait of James A. Garfield by Ole Peter Hansen Balling (1881)

After the Civil War ended, Alexander Hunter (2nd), who by that time had inherited Abingdon, succeeded in recovering his land in a case that the Supreme Court of the United States decided on March 21, 1870 (Bennett v. Hunter, 76 U.S. 326). James A. Garfield, a Republican member of the United States House of Representatives who had been a brigadier general in the Union Army during the Civil War and who later became the 20th president of the United States, was an attorney on Hunter's legal team.

Congressman Garfield received as compensation 43 acres (17 ha) in a part of Abingdon west of the Alexandria Canal that Alexander Hunter had platted in 1874 as the town of Abington. After moving into the White House upon his election to the Presidency, Garfield began the process of establishing a country home on his holding. Garfield's heirs and an improvement company continued to hold titles to that portion of the Abingdon estate until around the 1920s.

Following the Civil War, Alexander Hunter (2nd) was employed for 40 years as a clerk in the federal United States General Land Office. In 1877, he attempted to build a cattle stockyard on his Abingdon estate. In 1877–1879, he served as a Delegate in the Virginia General Assembly and as County Clerk of Alexandria.

In 1881, Hunter advertised Abingdon for sale. During the same year, he sold his remaining Abingdon property at auction to the Alfred Richards Brick Company. The property at Abingdon that Hunter once owned is now within Ronald Reagan Washington National Airport, Crystal City / National Landing, and the Aurora Hills section of the Aurora Highlands neighborhood.

==== Hunter v. Hume ====
Abingdon became the subject of a legal case (Hunter v. Hume) that the Supreme Court of Virginia decided on June 18, 1891. Alexander Hunter (2nd) attempted to recover from Hume a disputed strip of Abingdon land that lay between the Washington and Alexandria Turnpike (now U.S. Route 1) to the east and the Alexandria Canal (now South Eads Street) to the west. The Court ruled that the strip had rightfully passed to Hume.

=== Industrialization ===
In 1896, the Washington, Alexandria and Mount Vernon Railway began to run electric trolleys beside the abandoned Alexandria Canal west of Abingdon. By 1902, the railway was distributing a booklet for tourists that described Abingdon and other historic sites along its route. The booklet illustrated a house at Abingdon (identified as the "birth-place of Nellie Custis") that reportedly stood on the bank of Potomac River, a mile east of the railway's tracks beyond a brickyard.

In 1900, the New Washington Brick Company purchased the Abingdon property. The company used steam shovels to dig yellow clay out of the fields at Abingdon for the production of brick used in the construction of buildings in nearby Washington, D.C. In 1912, the Daughters of the American Revolution reported in their magazine that Abingdon was "gradually being eaten away by the steam shovel before which modern invention many old landmarks must fall."

Nevertheless, the Abingdon house was serving in 1922 as the residence of the brick company's superintendent and was in good condition. Vivian Allwine Ford, the superintendent's youngest child, was born in the Abingdon house in 1912 and lived there until 1922.

==== Structural and landscape architecture ====
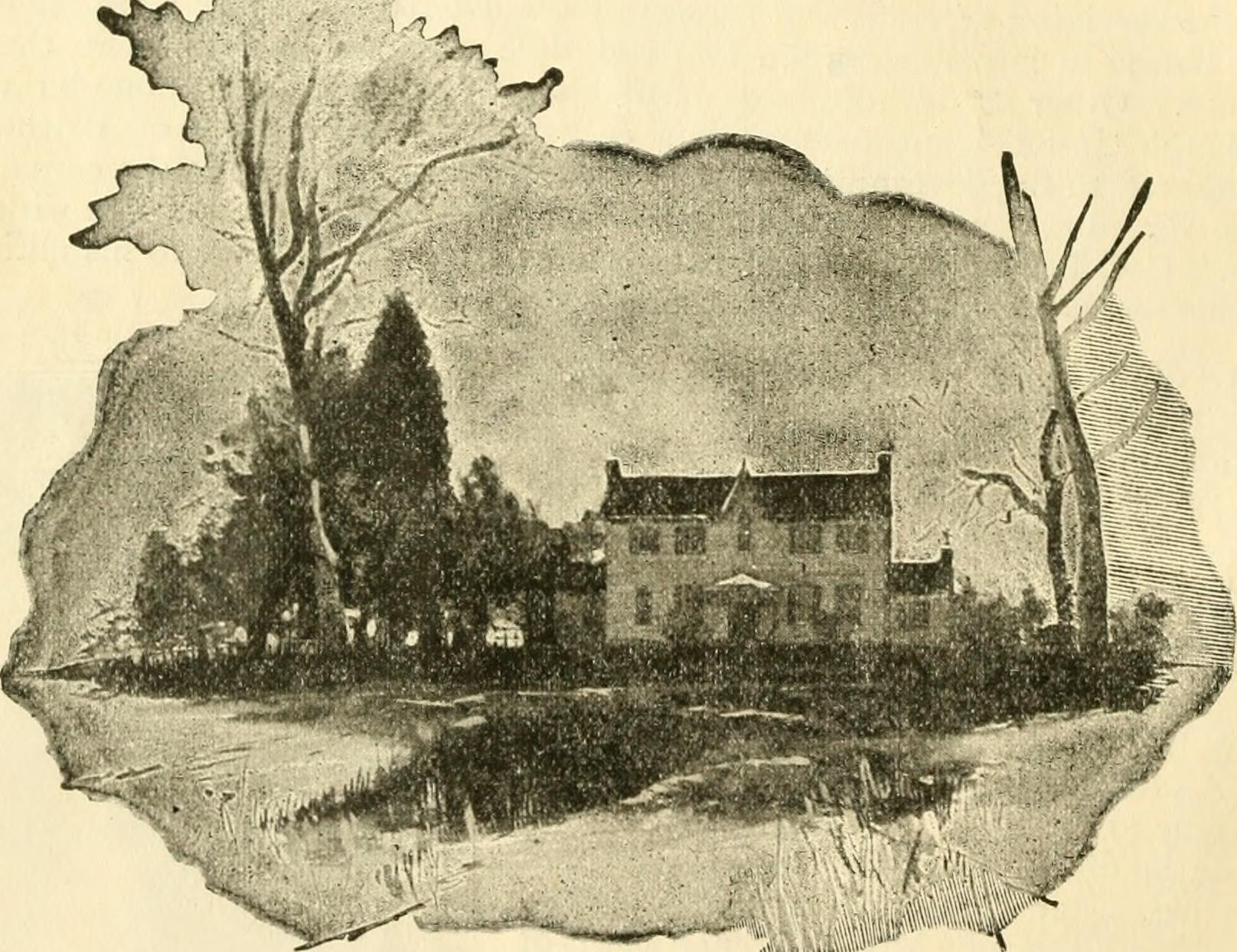
Abingdon House, before 1902

The house at Abingdon that existed during the early 20th century had a wood-frame in the Georgian style that faced east and west. The house was painted white with green shutters, had a shingled hip roof, and had a scattering grove of big trees to the front and sides.

At the east front was located Abingdon's principal garden where the land sloped gradually down to the Potomac River shore about five hundred yards away. Its beams and rafters were of a solid oak, two feet in diameter. It was two stories in height and exhibited red brick chimneys at the structure's north and south ends.

=== Deterioration, burning and stabilization ===
In 1922, Lewis Smoot purchased the Abingdon House and 158 acres (64 ha) of the original estate. Smoot transplanted the boxwood bushes that had surrounded the house to his home's lawn in Washington, D.C. In 1924, Smoot sold the property to the Richmond, Fredericksburg and Potomac Railroad (RF&P), which planned to extend its rail yard (Potomac Yard) onto the property.

From 1923 to 1927, members of the Beckworth family leased the Abingdon house and farmed the property's land. After the Beckworths vacated the house, the RF&P tried to sell and give away the house's materials to reduce the costs of removing the structure.

By 1928, the Abingdon house had become dilapidated. Visitors reported that people were tenting and enjoying a campfire nearby and that souvenir hunters had removed a cornerstone and parts of a chimney. In that year, the Washington Society of Alexandria asked the RF&P to defer the razing of the building until it could be restored. The Mt. Vernon Memorial Highway (now the George Washington Memorial Parkway) was constructed on Abingdon's grounds between 1929 and 1932.

On March 5, 1930, a fire destroyed the unrestored Abingdon house. The Association for the Preservation of Virginia Antiquities (APVA) (now named "Preservation Virginia") then stabilized the house's ruins. In 1933, the APVA commemorated the site and placed a historical marker there.

In addition, the Civilian Conservation Corps (CCC) worked on the Abingdon ruins, which in the early 1930s were located in the median of the George Washington Memorial Parkway. The CCC landscaped the grounds and built a parking lot, a concrete pad for a monument, and a cinder access road from the parkway to the site of the ruins. The CCC also built a reproduction well cover which was intended to be as close as possible to the design of the well house that was in use when Nelly Custis lived at Abingdon.

For more than 50 years thereafter, the Abingdon ruins remained largely undisturbed, despite the surrounding construction and expansion of Washington National Airport, which opened in 1941, and the construction of the nearby "Nelly Custis Airmen's Lounge". Photographs taken in 1934 and in the 1950s showed the conditions of parts of the ruins during that period, as did a sketch in a pamphlet describing the recently opened airport that the United States Civil Aeronautics Administration authored in 1941.

=== Metropolitan Washington Airports Authority ===
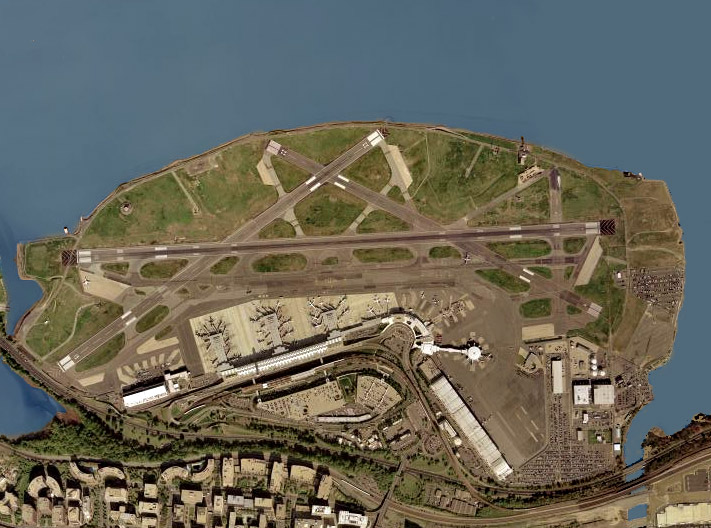
^{ United States Geological Survey } Ronald Reagan Washington National Airport (2002)

The Federal Aviation Administration of the United States Department of Transportation and other federal agencies owned and operated Washington National Airport until 1987. In that year, the airport was transferred to the newly formed Metropolitan Washington Airports Authority under a 50-year lease that the Metropolitan Washington Airports Act of 1986 (Title VI of Public Laws 99-500 and 99-591) had authorized. As a result, the Airports Authority obtained control of Abingdon's property, while the Federal government held title to the airport's lease.

Two years later, in 1989, the Airports Authority revealed that it was planning to replace the Abingdon ruins with a new parking garage. To comply with the provisions of Section 106 of the National Historic Preservation Act of 1966, the Authority commissioned a series of studies that described the history of Abingdon and the archaeological features of the Abingdon site and its surroundings.

The final report of the series, issued in 1991, summarized the studies and examined several alternative treatments of the site. The report stated:

... the Virginia Department of Historic Resources (State historic preservation office) concluded that there was insufficient evidence to link the existing "ruins" with any of the important historic individuals or families reported to have lived on the property. At the present time, there is no concrete evidence on the construction date or history of occupation of the structure represented by the existing ruins.

The 1991 report concluded with a recommendation from the Authority's engineering division that included:

..... the undertaking of an appropriate archaeological data recovery program at the site and the construction of a "museum quality" interpretive exhibit to be located within the terminal complex. Once data recovery was performed, parking structure construction would follow. The basis for this recommendation was the intention to avoid an adverse effect to the Abingdon Site (through comprehensive archaeological data recovery and public interpretation program) while at the same time providing the desired amount of parking in the near-terminal area.

The Airports Authority's actions ignited a public preservation effort that culminated in 1992 with legislation that the Virginia General Assembly enacted and that Governor L. Douglas Wilder approved. The legislation required the Airports Authority to "take all steps necessary to insure the preservation in place, the study, and the interpretation to the public" of the Abingdon ruins during a one-year period that followed the law's enactment. During that period, James Wilding, the general manager of the Airports Authority, reported to the Authority's planning committee that multiple options had been identified that would provide adequate parking without having to excavate the Abingdon site.

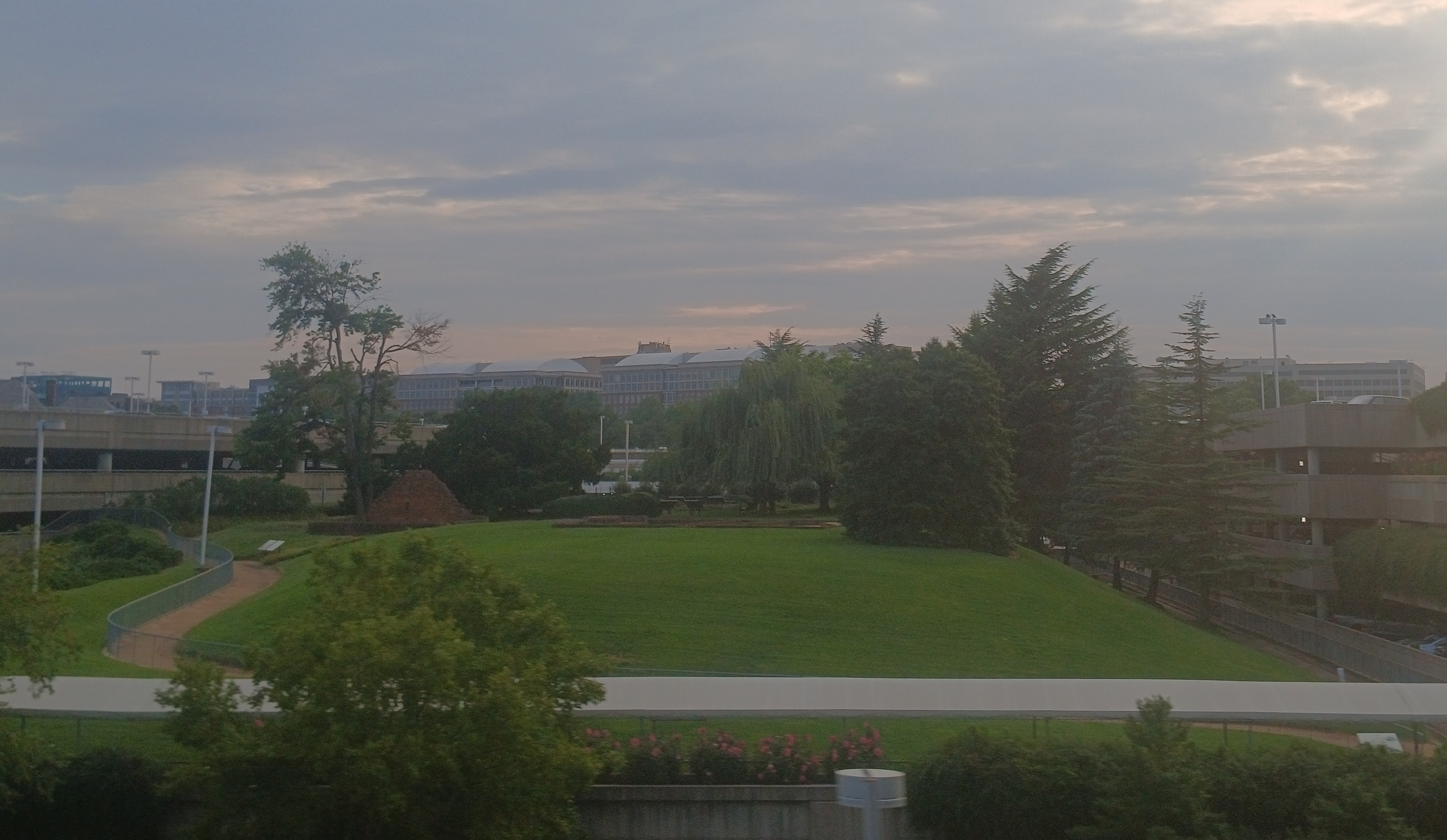
The Abingdon Plantation historical site, looking west from a Metrorail train passing through the airport (2024).

In 1994, the Airports Authority entered into a Memorandum of Agreement with Virginia and federal officials that assured, among other things, that the resources and historic setting of the site would be protected and that disturbance of the site's archaeological deposits would be avoided during the airport's redevelopment, which was then proceeding. The Authority also issued a March 1994 "Preservation Plan" that summarized the measures that the Authority would take to preserve, repair and protect significant features of the site, while removing other features that the Authority did not consider to be of historical significance.

In 1998, an Airports Authority contractor conducted an archaeological investigation of the Abingdon site, preserved and repaired some of site's remnants and removed others. The Authority relocated some of the artifacts that the contractor had found at the site to a display in a new exhibit hall that the Authority constructed in the airport's original 1941 terminal (Terminal A). A panel in the exhibit hall later reported that archaeologists had recovered over 37,000 artifacts from the Abingdon site since 1988.

The contractor preserved parts of the brick foundations of the Abingdon house and its nearby kitchen, but not all remained visible. The contractor used some of the original foundation's bricks to rebuild a 6 inches (15 cm)-high foundation over a new concrete base. The contractor also used new building materials when restoring portions of the original foundations.

As a result, when the Airports Authority completed the Abingdon site's restoration in 1998, the ruins were reportedly gone, the main foundation looked new and a well had been covered over. Photographs of the reconstructed Abingdon house foundation and kitchen/laundry taken in 2006, 2008 and 2009 illustrated the restoration's condition eight to eleven years later. A group of 2010 photographs also illustrated various features of the renovation and its surroundings.

== Historical markers at the Abingdon Plantation site ==
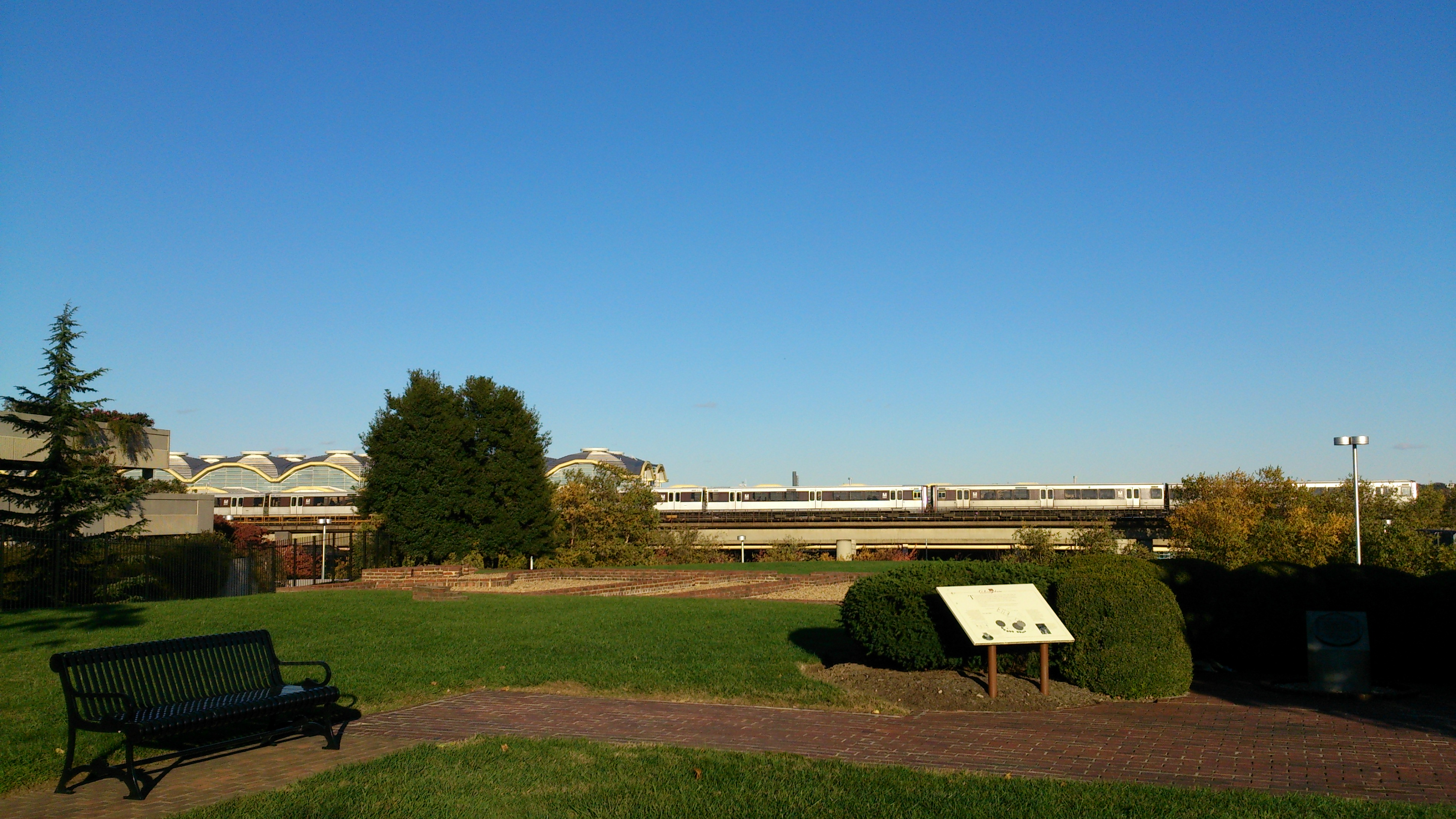
The Abingdon Plantation Restoration historical marker, looking east with the reconstructed Abingdon house foundation and a Metrorail train in background (2013).

The Airport Authority's Abingdon Plantation site contains a sequential series of nine historical markers that describe the history of the plantation, its occupants and its site. The Airports Authority erected all but two of these. The markers are:

- The Ages of Abingdon
- The Alexander Family
- Abingdon and John Alexander
- The Custis Family
- Abingdon Plantation
- The Hunter Family
- The Industrial Age
- Abingdon
- Abingdon Plantation Restoration

In 2024, the Authority erected three markers describing the slaves who lived in Abingdon. A marker at the entrance to the site lists the first names of those whom the Authority knew at the time. The other markers tell stories about individual slaves who lived there. The three markers are:

- Becoming Visible - Meet the Enslaved at Abingdon Plantation
- The Stable Manager - Rented to George Washington
- The Dress - A Fashionable Gown:

== Abingdon artifacts in airport exhibit hall ==
The airport's Terminal A contains an exhibit hall with panels displaying artifacts excavated at the Abingdon Plantation site. The panels are:

- Digging Through Layers of Time
- Daily Life: Colonial Times at Abingdon Plantation
- Trade Unites Abingdon with the World

== Location ==
The Abingdon Plantation site is located on a knoll between the airport's parking Garage A and Garage B/C. It can be reached by walking from either garage, from the south end of the nearby Ronald Reagan Washington National Airport Metrorail station and from the Mount Vernon Bike-Hike Trail.
