= Alexander Hunter (novelist) =

American novelist

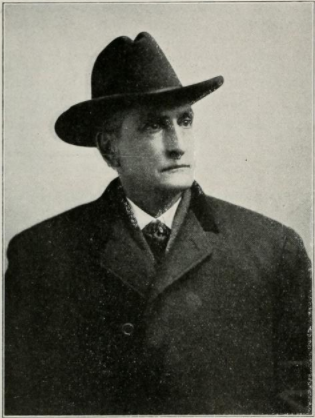
- Born: 1843
- Died: June 30, 1914 (aged 70–71)
- Resting place: Arlington National Cemetery, Arlington County, Virginia, U.S.
- Occupations: Soldier; civil servant; writer
- Spouses: Alice A. Swain (m. 1882); Filah Adele Holben Sanford (m. 1906)
- Writing career
- Notable works: Johnny Reb and Billy Yank, The Women of the Debatable Land

Alexander Hunter (1843- June 30, 1914) was an American soldier for the Confederate States Army, civil servant, and novelist who authored Johnny Reb and Billy Yank and The Women of the Debatable Land.

== Early life ==
Hunter was born in 1843 and was a member of the Hunter family. He was the son of Bushrod Hunter and Mary Frances Blow.

He lived during his youth at the Abingdon plantation in present-day Arlington County, Virginia and studied at private schools until the start of the American Civil War in 1861.

== Civil War ==
Hunter became a private in the Confederate Army where he served in Company A of the 17th Virginia Infantry for the first two years of the war. Hunter was captured in 1862 but was exchanged in time to fight at Antietam. He was paroled soon after being captured again on September 17, 1862, at Antietam and went on to participate in the Battle of Chancellorsville.

Following Chancellorsville, Hunter joined Company H in the 4th Virginia Cavalry Regiment, also known as the "Black Horse Troop", on the recommendation of General Robert E. Lee. Captured once more, he attempted escape twice and finally returned to his regiment to serve until the Confederate surrender. Wounded twice during the war, Hunter was pardoned by President Andrew Johnson on September 4, 1865.

== Later life ==
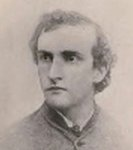
Hunter c. 1858-1870

Following the end of the Civil War, Hunter found that Abingdon plantation, which he had inherited, had been confiscated by the United States Tax Commissioners in 1864. He won his lands back after the (Bennett v. Hunter, 76 U.S. 326) case was decided by the Supreme Court of the United States on March 21, 1870.

Hunter was employed for 40 years as a clerk in the United States General Land Office. In 1877-1879, he served as a Delegate in the Virginia General Assembly and as County Clerk of Alexandria.

In 1881, Hunter advertised Abingdon for sale. During the same year, he sold his remaining Abingdon property at auction to the Alfred Richards Brick Company. The property at Abingdon that Hunter once owned is now within Ronald Reagan Washington National Airport, Crystal City and the Aurora Hills section of the Aurora Highlands neighborhood.

Hunter was married to Alice A. Swain by George Armstrong on June 22, 1882. Alice Swain was a student of music at the Philadelphia Academy. Hunter sued for divorce on December 10, 1894 after Swain purportedly deserted him in September 6, 1892. He married Filah Sanford after the death of his first wife in 1898.

Hunter authored the story Confederate prisoners in Boston, which was published in 1900. He subsequently wrote a seven hundred page memoir Johnny Reb and Billy Yank. It was published in 1905 by Neale Publishing Co. His final book, The Women of the Debatable Land, was published in 1912.

== Death and interment ==
Hunter died of Tuberculosis on June 30, 1914. In July 1914, he was buried in the Confederate section of Arlington National Cemetery. His gravesite is at Section 16, grave A, in Jackson Circle, within a few miles of his antebellum home at Abingdon. The National Museum of American History holds within its collections the shell jacket that he wore throughout most of the Civil War.

== Bibliography ==
- The Ancient Iron Pot (Unknown)
- New National theater, Washington, D.C (1885)
- Confederate prisoners in Boston (1900)
- Johnny Reb & Billy Yank (1905)
- The Huntsman in the South (1908)
- The Women of the Debatable Land (1912)

Bibliography from Open Library and other sources found below.
