= Pace v. Alabama =

- Supreme Court of the United States

Argued January 16, 1883 Decided January 29, 1883
- Full case name: Pace v. State of Alabama
- Citations: 106 U.S. 583 (more) 1 S. Ct. 637; 27 L. Ed. 207; 1882 U.S. LEXIS 1584

Case history
- Prior: Defendants convicted, 5 Circuit Court, 1881; sentenced each to two years in the state penitentiary; affirmed, Alabama Supreme Court (69 Ala 231, 233 (1882))

Holding
- Alabama's anti-miscegenation statute is constitutional because the punishment proscribed for engaging in interracial sex is identical for members of different race engaging in the aforementioned conduct. Supreme Court of Alabama affirmed.

Court membership
- Chief Justice Morrison Waite Associate Justices Samuel F. Miller · Stephen J. Field; Joseph P. Bradley · John M. Harlan; William B. Woods · Stanley Matthews; Horace Gray · Samuel Blatchford

Case opinion
- Majority: Field, joined by unanimous

Laws applied
- U.S Const. amend XIV; Ala. code 4184, 4189
- Overruled by
- McLaughlin v. Florida, 379 U.S. 184 (1964); Loving v. Virginia, 388 U.S. 1 (1967)

Pace v. Alabama, 106 U.S. 583 (1883), was a case in which the United States Supreme Court affirmed that Alabama's anti-miscegenation statute was constitutional based on an argument that the punishment for violating the law against miscegenation applied the same without regard to race. This logic was clearly rejected by the Supreme Court in 1964 in McLaughlin v. Florida and in 1967 in Loving v. Virginia. Pace v. Alabama is one of the oldest court cases in America pertaining to interracial sex.

== Summary ==
The plaintiff, Tony Pace, an African-American man, and Mary Cox, a white woman, were residents of the state of Alabama, who had been arrested in 1881 because their sexual relationship violated the state's anti-miscegenation statute. They were charged with living together "in a state of adultery or fornication" and both sentenced to two years imprisonment in the state penitentiary in 1882.

Because "miscegenation", that is marriage, cohabitation and sexual relations between people of different racial backgrounds, was prohibited by Alabama's anti-miscegenation statute (Ala. code 4189), it would have been illegal for the couple to marry in Alabama. However, Tony Pace and Mary Cox were not married, for this reason, and they did not live together. They spent time together near their homes in Clarke County, north of Mobile. They could not marry each other under Alabama law. Interracial marital sex was deemed a felony, whereas extramarital sex ("adultery or fornication") was only a misdemeanor.

Because of the criminalization of interracial relationships, they were penalized more severely for their extramarital relationship than if they had been of the same race. The Alabama code stated:

If any white person and any negro, or the descendant of any negro to the third generation, inclusive, though one ancestor of each generation was a white person, intermarry or live in adultery or fornication with each other, each of them must, on conviction, be imprisoned in the penitentiary or sentenced to hard labor for the county for not less than two nor more than seven years.

== Appeals ==
=== Procedural error in Cox indictment ===
Cox argued to the state Supreme Court that her indictment should be quashed on the basis that she had been charged and indicted under the name "Mary Ann Cox", but her name was in fact, "Mary Jane Cox". The Alabama Supreme Court rejected this argument and upheld the indictment:

"The law knows but one Christian name, and the insertion or omission of a defendant's middle name in an indictment is entirely immaterial; and a mistake in the middle name will not support a plea of misnomer."

=== Fourteenth Amendment ===
On appeal to the Supreme Court of the state, the judgment was affirmed. Pace brought the case there, insisting that the act which he was indicted and convicted under conflicted with the final clause of the first section of the Fourteenth Amendment of the Constitution, which declares that no state shall deny to any person the equal protection of the laws.

=== Final decision ===
The Alabama Supreme Court upheld the convictions. Each defendant's punishment was the same. The punishment for interracial cohabitation was focused not "against the person of any particular color or race, but against the offense, the nature of which is determined by the opposite color of the cohabiting parties.” The “evil tendency” was greater in that kind of relationship than if both defendants were of the same race, since it could lead to “a mongrel population and a degraded civilization.” The true severity of their offense did not really stem from the interracial relationship, but instead that the fornication could end in an amalgamation, or, simply, a mixed-race child.

On further appeal to the Supreme Court of the United States, the court ruled that the criminalization of interracial sex did not violate the Equal Protection Clause of the Fourteenth Amendment because whites and non-whites were punished in equal measure for the offense of engaging in interracial sex. The Court did not need to affirm the constitutionality of the ban on interracial marriage that was also part of Alabama's anti-miscegenation law, since the plaintiff had chosen not to appeal that section of the statute.

== Later cases ==
The decision was understood, from that time to the 1960s, as reflecting a validation of state anti-miscegenation laws. However, the Supreme Court had not confronted the question of whether, given that Pace and Cox could not become husband and wife, they would inevitably be liable to prosecution for "adultery or fornication" if they lived as such. Only by implication had the ban against interracial marriage been addressed. Moreover, only by indirection did the Court address the question of whether, since it was a first offense, the sentence should have been for no more than six months. However, the later case Plessy v. Ferguson (joined by all Supreme Court Justices other than John Marshall Harlan), the Supreme Court in dicta stated that "Laws forbidding the intermarriage of the two races may be said in a technical sense to interfere with the freedom of contract, and yet have been universally recognized as within the police power of the State."

In any event, the Court had upheld the Alabama laws, and no southern state, for the next 80 years, displayed any inclination to repeal such laws. The Supreme Court's decision in Pace v. Alabama would prove to have an even more durable career in the American law of interracial sex and, by extension, marriage than Plessy v. Ferguson would have on segregated transportation and, by extension, education.

After Pace v. Alabama, the constitutionality of anti-miscegenation laws banning marriage and sex between whites and non-whites remained unchallenged until the 1940s. In 1967, these laws were ruled unconstitutional by the Supreme Court in Loving v. Virginia (1967).
