= United States v. Harris =

- Supreme Court of the United States

Decided January 22, 1883
- Full case name: United States v. R. G. Harris, et al.
- Citations: 106 U.S. 629 (more) 1 S. Ct. 601; 27 L. Ed. 290; 1882 U.S. LEXIS 1595

Holding
- Local governments, not the federal government, have the power to penalize crimes such as assault and murder.

Court membership
- Chief Justice Morrison Waite Associate Justices Samuel F. Miller · Stephen J. Field; Joseph P. Bradley · John M. Harlan; William B. Woods · Stanley Matthews; Horace Gray · Samuel Blatchford

Case opinions
- Majority: Woods, joined by Waite, Miller, Field, Bradley, Mathews, Gray, Blatchford
- Dissent: Harlan (on jurisdiction alone)

Laws applied
- U.S. Const. Amend. XIV; Section 2 of the Third Enforcement Act

United States v. Harris, 106 U.S. 629 (1883), was a case in which the US Supreme Court held that it was unconstitutional for the federal government to penalize crimes such as assault and murder in most circumstances. The Court declared that only state governments have the power to penalize those crimes.

In the specific case, four men were removed from a Crockett County, Tennessee, jail by a group led by Sheriff R. G. Harris and 19 others. The four men were beaten, and one was killed. A deputy sheriff tried to prevent the act but failed.

Section 2 of the Force Act of 1871 was declared unconstitutional on the theory that an act to enforce the Equal Protection Clause applied only to state actions, not individuals' actions.

== See also ==
- List of United States Supreme Court cases, volume 106
- United States v. Morrison
