= Ex parte Curtis =

- Supreme Court of the United States

Argued October 24–25, 1882 Decided December 18, 1882
- Full case name: Ex parte Curtis
- Citations: 106 U.S. 371 (more) 1 S. Ct. 381; 27 L. Ed. 232; 16 Otto 371

Case history
- Prior: From the Circuit Court for the Southern District of New York

Holding
- The sixth section of the act of August 15, 1876, is not unconstitutional

Court membership
- Chief Justice Morrison Waite Associate Justices Samuel F. Miller · Stephen J. Field; Joseph P. Bradley · John M. Harlan; William B. Woods · Stanley Matthews; Horace Gray · Samuel Blatchford

Case opinions
- Majority: Waite, joined by Miller, Field, Harlan, Woods, Matthews, Gray, Blatchford
- Dissent: Bradley

Ex parte Curtis, 106 U.S. 371 (1882), is an 8–1 ruling by the United States Supreme Court that the Act of August 15, 1876 was a constitutional exercise of the enumerated powers of the United States Congress under Article I, Section 8 of the United States Constitution.

The petitioner had been convicted of receiving money for political purposes in violation of the Act. The petitioner asked the Supreme Court for a writ of habeas corpus.

== Majority opinion ==
Chief Justice Morrison Waite wrote the opinion for the majority. The constitutional grounds under which the petitioner challenged the Act were not discussed by the Court. Waite noted that Congress had a lengthy history of passing laws restricting the rights and privileges of civil servants, and the constitutionality of such laws had never before been challenged.

Next, Waite affirmed that Article I, Section 8 of the Constitution clearly gave Congress the power to determine for itself what was proper in the realm of reining in political corruption:

The evident purpose of Congress in all this class of enactments has been to promote efficiency and integrity in the discharge of official duties, and to maintain proper discipline in the public service. Clearly such a purpose is within the just scope of legislative power, and it is not easy to see why the act now under consideration does not come fairly within the legitimate means to such an end.

Waite refused to pass judgment on the validity of the writ of habeas corpus, concluding that the Supreme Court's "jurisdiction is limited to the single question of the power of the court to commit the prisoner for the act of which he has been convicted."

== Dissenting opinion ==
Associate Justice Joseph P. Bradley dissented. He concluded that the Act impermissibly infringed on First Amendment rights of freedom of speech and freedom of association:

The offices of the government do not belong to the Legislative Department to dispose of on any conditions it may choose to impose.... To deny to a man the privilege of associating and making joint contributions with such other citizens as he may choose, is an unjust restraint of his right to propagate and promote his views on public affairs. The freedom of speech and of the press, and that of assembling together to consult upon and discuss matters of public interest, and to join in petitioning for a redress of grievances, are expressly secured by the Constitution. The spirit of this clause covers and embraces the right of every citizen to engage in such discussions, and to promote the views of himself and his associates freely, without being trammelled by inconvenient restrictions. Such restrictions, in my judgment, are imposed by the law in question.

Justice Bradley also concluded that the Act was overbroad and that the same positive ends (ending political corruption) could have been achieved by alternative, narrower means.

== Assessment ==
One of the interesting aspects of the majority's decision is that it believed Congress prohibited not civil servants from making political donations on their own but making such donations through their supervisors. Justice Bradley dissented, in part, by arguing that the law banned even voluntary contributions made through superiors (a ban that he felt was unconstitutional).

At least one commentator has concluded that Ex parte Curtis is still "good law."
