= Johnny Reb and Billy Yank (comic strip) =

American comic strip by Frank Giacoia

Johnny Reb and Billy Yank was a Sunday comic strip drawn by Frank Giacoia from November 18, 1956, to May 24, 1959. It was one of the last full page Sunday strips. The last full page appeared on September 22, 1957. On May 18, 1958, the title changed to Johnny Reb. Some Sundays were ghosted by other artists, including Jack Kirby and Joe Kubert.

== Characters and story ==
The strip told the story of the American Civil War, roughly chronicling events that had taken place 95 years earlier. The first 11 stories (of 20) alternated between the adventures of Johnny Reb, who fought for the South, and Billy Yank, who fought for the North. They met briefly in the first story, and "Secret Staff Order Number 191" featured both characters. After that, Billy Yank appeared in only one additional story, "The Copperhead Strikes."

== Stories ==
- 1956
  - Manassas
  - General Lyon
- 1957
  - Prison Boat
  - Fort Donaldson
  - Scalpers
  - Shiloh
  - Second Bull Run
  - Haven
  - Guerrillas
  - Court Martial
  - Hannibal the Mule
  - Secret Staff Order Number 191
  - Undercover Mission
- 1958
  - The Copperhead Strikes!
  - Lincoln
  - Angel Sabra
  - Under Cover
  - Alaska is a Woman
- 1959:
  - Socrates Graves
  - John Wilkes Booth
  - Spy (story incomplete when strip ended)

== See also ==
- Johnny Reb and Billy Yank, 1905 novel
