= McLaughlin v. Florida =

- Supreme Court of the United States

Argued October 13–14, 1964 Decided December 7, 1964
- Full case name: McLaughlin, et al. v. Florida
- Citations: 379 U.S. 184 (more) 85 S. Ct. 283; 13 L. Ed. 2d 222; 1964 U.S. LEXIS 63

Case history
- Prior: Defendants convicted, Fl Sup Ct affirmed. Appeal from the Supreme Court of Florida
- Subsequent: Convictions set aside

Holding
- Florida's statute prohibiting an unmarried interracial couple from habitually living in and occupying the same room in the nighttime is inconsistent with the Equal Protection Clause of the Fourteenth Amendment because identical conduct, when engaged in by members of the same race, is not prohibited. Supreme Court of Florida reversed and remanded.

Court membership
- Chief Justice Earl Warren Associate Justices Hugo Black · William O. Douglas; Tom C. Clark · John M. Harlan II; William J. Brennan Jr. · Potter Stewart; Byron White · Arthur Goldberg

Case opinions
- Majority: White, joined by Warren, Black, Clark, Harlan, Brennan, Goldberg
- Concurrence: Harlan
- Concurrence: Stewart (in judgment), joined by Douglas

Laws applied
- U.S. Const. amend. XIV; Fla. Stat. § 798.05
- This case overturned a previous ruling or rulings
- Pace v. Alabama (1883) (in part)

McLaughlin v. Florida, 379 U.S. 184 (1964), was a case in which the United States Supreme Court ruled unanimously that a cohabitation law of Florida, part of the state's anti-miscegenation laws, was unconstitutional. The law prohibited habitual cohabitation by two unmarried people of opposite sex, if one was black and the other was white. The decision overturned Pace v. Alabama (1883), which had declared such statutes constitutional. It did not overturn the related Florida statute that prohibited interracial marriage between whites and blacks. Such laws were declared unconstitutional in 1967 in Loving v. Virginia.

== Facts ==
In 1962, Dewey McLaughlin, a Miami Beach hotel porter originally from Honduras, and Connie Hoffman, a Caucasian waitress, were an unmarried couple living together in a Miami Beach apartment located at 732 2nd Street. Their landlady, Dora Goodnick, had rented the apartment only to Hoffman, and, when she found out about McLaughlin, she did not want the interracial unmarried couple living in the apartment. In an effort to get them out, Goodnick complained to the Miami Beach police that Hoffman's son was wandering the streets after midnight. Police investigated the matter, and, after the couple admitted that they were unmarried and lived together, they were charged in Florida state court with the crime of a black man and a white woman habitually living in and occupying in the nighttime the same room. A jury trial resulted in a verdict of guilty, a sentence of thirty days in the county jail, and a fine of $150 (equivalent to $1,600 in 2025) for each defendant.

Section 798.05 of Florida statutes read: "Any negro man and white woman, or any white man and negro woman, who are not married to each other, who shall habitually live in and occupy in the nighttime the same room shall each be punished by imprisonment not exceeding twelve months, or by fine not exceeding five hundred dollars."

This law was one of the adultery and fornication laws of Florida. While all the other sections of this chapter required proof that sexual intercourse took place, Section 798.05 required only cohabitation. The law specifically prohibited a couple in which one is white and the other is black. It did not apply to any other racial groups or combinations. It was part of Florida's anti-miscegenation laws prohibiting marriage, cohabitation, and extramarital sex between whites and blacks, and addressed only relationships between whites and non-whites. Similar anti-miscegenation laws were enforced in many states into the 1960s, and by all Southern states until 1967, when all remaining state bans on interracial marriage between whites and non-whites were declared unconstitutional by the Supreme Court in Loving v. Virginia.

== Result ==
Justice White in his majority opinion held that the law, as it made a special case for couples of these two specific races, bore a "heavier burden of justification". Florida had not demonstrated any reason that made such a race-specific prohibition necessary.

That a general evil will be partially corrected may at times, and without more, serve to justify the limited application of a criminal law; but legislative discretion to employ the piecemeal approach stops short of permitting a State to narrow statutory coverage to focus on a racial group.

Justice Harlan, in his concurrence, emphasized the "heavier burden" requirement that White described and wrote that the law should pass a "necessity test", which is very stringent and applied to free speech cases.

Justices Stewart and Douglas joined in an even stronger concurrence and denied even the possibility of an "overriding statutory purpose" that would justify such a law. Stewart wrote, "We deal here with a criminal law which imposes criminal punishment. And I think it is simply not possible for a state law to be valid under our Constitution which makes the criminality of an act depend upon the race of the actor. Discrimination of that kind is invidious per se."

Though the state claimed that Section 798.05 (prohibiting cohabitation) was ancillary to Section 741.11 (prohibiting intermarriage), the Court did not consider the latter statute, and it remained in force until Loving v. Virginia (1967).

== See also ==
- List of United States Supreme Court cases, volume 379
- Pace v. Alabama
- Perez v. Sharp
- Loving v. Virginia
