= Johnny Reb =

Personification of US Confederate soldier

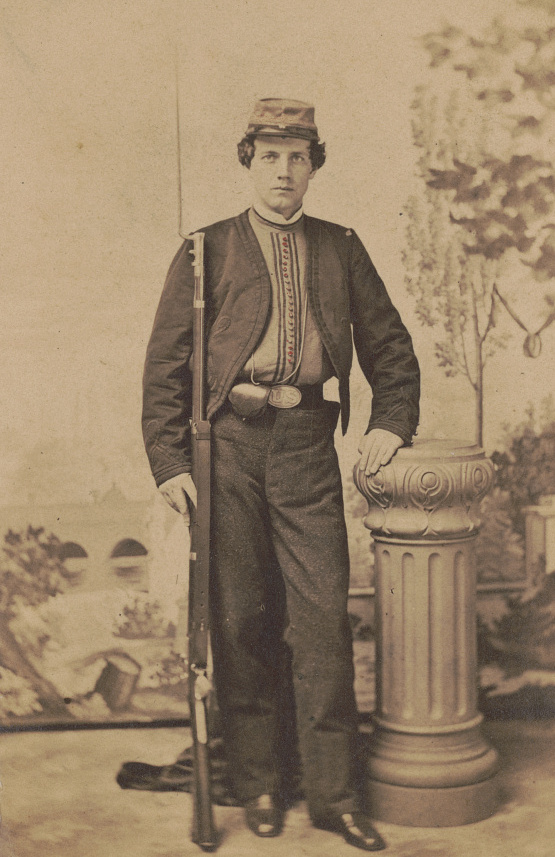
Corporal Adrian D. Price of the 21st Virginia Infantry Regiment

Johnny Reb is the national personification of the common soldier of the Confederate States Army. During the American Civil War and afterwards, Johnny Reb and his Union counterpart Billy Yank were used in speech and literature to symbolize the common soldiers who fought in the conflict. The symbolic image of Johnny Reb in Southern culture has been represented in its novels, poems, art, public statuary, photography, and written history. According to the historian Bell I. Wiley, who wrote about the common soldiers of the Northern and the Southern armies, the name appears to have its origins in the habit of Union soldiers calling out, "Hello, Johnny" or "Howdy, Reb" to Confederate soldiers on the other side of the picket line.

Johnny Reb is often pictured as a Confederate soldier in gray wool uniform with the typical kepi-style forage cap made of wool broadcloth or cotton jean cloth with a rounded, flat top, cotton lining, and leather visor. He is often shown as well with his weapons or with the Confederate flag, sometimes both.

Johnny Reb has been used as a nickname for veteran Confederate soldiers, as well as to refer to white natives of the states that formerly belonged to the Confederacy. The sobriquet is still commonly used in scholarly writing by Southern and Northern authors; for example, Robert N. Rosen, a Jewish native of South Carolina who has written extensively about the roles Southern Jews played in the Confederate States Army, refers to "Jewish Johnny Rebs". The term Johnny Reb is still sometimes used in popular writing and in news media. In 2000, The Los Angeles Times published an article by the historian Eric Foner entitled, Chief Johnny Reb, in reference to Jefferson Davis, the Confederate president. A 2018 book review by historian Drew Gilpin Faust appeared in The Wall Street Journal under the title Billy Yank and Johnny Reb.

== Use in media ==
- "Johnny Reb" is a Confederate soldier's song written in 1959 by Merle Kilgore and popularized by Johnny Horton.
- Johnny Reb and Billy Yank (1956–1959) was a comic strip about the American Civil War featuring Johnny Reb as a character.
- "Johnny Reb" is the name of a wargame first published in 1983
- "Johnny Reb" is addressed in the lyrics of a song by R.E.M. called "Swan Swan H" on their 1986 album Lifes Rich Pageant.

== See also ==
- Brother Jonathan
- Edwin Francis Jemison
- Uncle Sam
- Colonel Reb
- Hey Reb!
