= Johnny Reb and Billy Yank (book) =

1905 novel by Alexander Hunter

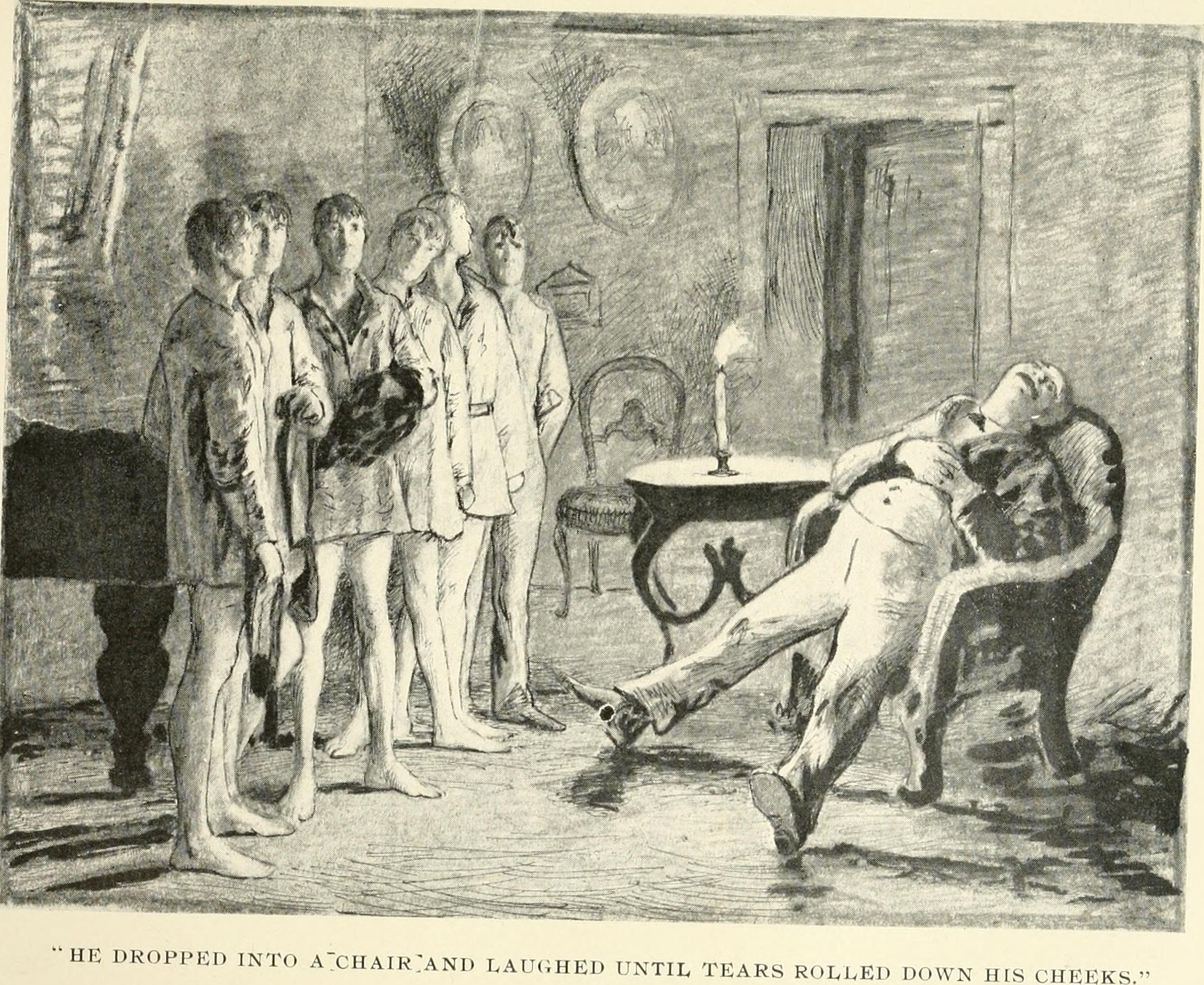
- Author: Alexander Hunter
- Language: English
- Publication date: 1905

Johnny Reb and Billy Yank is a novel first published in 1905 by Alexander Hunter, a Confederate soldier who served in the 17th Virginia Infantry and the 4th Virginia Cavalry from 1861 to 1865. The novel is noted for encapsulating most of the major events of the American Civil War, due to Hunter's involvement in the war.

The contents of the "novel" are pulled from Hunter's own diaries which he kept during the war. He explains his reasons for publishing his accounts in the preface to the novel-

The public have been surfeited with war literature. There is hardly a prominent officer North or South who has not rushed into print at every available opportunity; yet no officer high in rank dared write the exact truth, for the reason he has the feelings, the self-love and the reputations of those who served under him to consider.

A private in the ranks, who has learned something of the art of war through though experience in two branches of the service, should be able to write understandingly of that internecine conflict which rocked America like an earthquake.

At least he can afford to tell the truth as to what he saw, heard and thought without fear or favor. And above all, a private in the ranks, having no grievance, can be fair and just.

In those days "Johnny Reb" and Billy Yank" were good comrades when off duty. They had a profound respect for each other, and as Bulwer says, "It is astonishing how much we like a man after fighting him."

The novel is then divided into two parts, the first part chronicling Hunter's service in the infantry up until the Battle of Chancellorsville, and the second part depicting his service in the Cavalry until the end of the war.

Although Hunter is not credited with popularizing the term Johnny Reb he does dedicate the novel to "that tattered son of fortune and the nursling of many a dark and stormy hour, this book is affectionately dedicated by the AUTHOR"
