= List of United States Supreme Court cases by the Waite Court =

Supreme Court of the United States
Waite Court
- Chase Court ← → Fuller Court
- March 4, 1874 – March 23, 1888 (14 years, 19 days)
- Seat: Old Senate Chamber; Washington, D.C.
- No. of positions: 9
- Waite Court decisions

This is a partial chronological list of cases decided by the United States Supreme Court during the tenure of Chief Justice Morrison Waite from March 4, 1874, through March 23, 1888.

Case name	Citation	Summary
Totten v. United States	92 U.S. 105 (1875)	Jurisdiction over espionage agreements.
Rubber-Tip Pencil Co. v. Howard	87 U.S. 498 (1874)	Patent eligibility of abstract ideas.
Murdock v. City of Memphis	87 U.S. 590 (1875)	Jurisdiction over state court decisions.
Minor v. Happersett	88 U.S. 162 (1875)	Fourteenth Amendment and the right of women to vote.
Kohl v. United States	91 U.S. 367 (1875)	Eminent domain.
Phillips v. Payne	92 U.S. 105 (1875)	Validity of retrocession of Alexandria County from the District of Columbia to Virginia.
United States v. Reese	92 U.S. 214 (1876)	Fifteenth Amendment and the right to vote.
Chy Lung v. Freeman	92 U.S. 275 (1876)	Federal power to set rules surrounding immigration.
United States v. Cruikshank	92 U.S. 542 (1875)	Application of the First and Second Amendments to the states.
Munn v. Illinois	94 U.S. 113 (1876)	Corporations and agricultural regulation.
Cochrane v. Deener	94 U.S. 780 (1876)	Patent eligibility of processes.
Mobile Life Insurance Co. v. Brame	95 U.S. 754 (1877)	Cause for civil action for murder at common law and the Civil Code of Louisiana.
Pennoyer v. Neff	95 U.S. 714 (1877)	Bases of personal jurisdiction over defendants.
Davidson v. City of New Orleans	96 U.S. 97 (1878)	Procedural requirements of the Fourteenth Amendment's Due Process Clause.
City of Elizabeth v. American Nicholson Pavement Co.	97 U.S. 126 (1878)	Experimental use exception to the on-sale bar in United States patent law.
United States v. Throckmorton	98 U.S. 61 (1878)	Intrinsic and extrinsic fraud distinguished.
Reynolds v. United States	98 U.S. 145 (1878)	Polygamy and freedom of religion.
Wilkerson v. Utah	99 U.S. 130 (1878)	Capital punishment.
Trade-Mark Cases	100 U.S. 82 (1879)	Copyright Clause does not give Congress the power to regulate trademarks.
Baker v. Selden	101 U.S. 99 (1879)	Differences between copyright & patent law.
Strauder v. West Virginia	100 U.S. 303 (1880)	Exclusion of blacks from juries.
Springer v. United States	102 U.S. 586 (1881)	Constitutionality of income tax set up by the Revenue Act of 1864.
Kilbourn v. Thompson	103 U.S. 168 (1880)	Limitations on Congressional investigations.
Egbert v. Lippmann	104 U.S. 333 (1881)	Early case concerning the on-sale bar in patent law.
United States v. McBratney	104 U.S. 621 (1881)	Congress must explicitly reserve jurisdiction over Native American lands when admitting a State to the union.
United States v. Lee	106 U.S. 196 (1882)	Federal sovereign immunity does not extend to government officers.
Ex parte Curtis	106 U.S. 371 (1882)	Constitutionality of a law prohibiting government officers from requesting, giving to, or receiving from other government officers any amount of money for political purposes.
Pace v. Alabama	106 U.S. 583 (1883)	Affirmed that Alabama's anti-miscegenation statute banning interracial marriage and interracial sex was not a violation of the Fourteenth Amendment.
United States v. Harris (the Ku Klux Case)	106 U.S. 629 (1883)	No Congressional power to pass ordinary criminal statutes.
Civil Rights Cases	109 U.S. 3 (1883)	Power of federal government to prohibit racial discrimination by private parties.
Ex parte Crow Dog	109 U.S. 556 (1883)	Repeal of law dealing with Native American Indians requires express language by Congress.
Kellogg Bridge Co. v. Hamilton	110 U.S. 108 (1884)	An implied warranty of fitness for a particular purpose exists when the seller is also the manufacturer.
Juilliard v. Greenman	110 U.S. 421 (1884)	Constitutionality of issuing greenbacks as legal tender.
Hurtado v. California	110 U.S. 516 (1884)	No requirement under the Fourteenth Amendment that states use a grand jury to indict a defendant in a murder prosecution.
Burrow-Giles Lithographic Co. v. Sarony	111 U.S. 53 (1884)	Copyrightability of photographs.
New England Mutual Life Insurance Co. v. Woodworth	111 U.S. 138 (1884)	insurance law
Elk v. Wilkins	112 U.S. 94 (1884)	Native Americans born on Indian reservations are not entitled to birthright citizenship under the Fourteenth Amendment's Citizenship Clause.
Head Money Cases	112 U.S. 580 (1884)	Acts of Congress affecting the enforcement, modification, or repeal of treaties are constitutional.
Cole v. La Grange	113 U.S. 1 (1885)	The court held that the Missouri legislature could not authorize a city to issue bonds to assist corporations in their private business.
Head v. Amoskeag Manufacturing Co.	113 U.S. 9 (1885)	
Barbier v. Connolly	113 U.S. 27 (1885)	
Liverpool, New York & Philadelphia Steamship Co. v. Commissioners of Emigration	113 U.S. 33 (1885)	
Davison v. Von Lingen	113 U.S. 40 (1885)	
Drennen v. London Assurance Co.	113 U.S. 51 (1885)	
Hollister v. Benedict & Burnham Manufacturing Co.	113 U.S. 59 (1885)	
Hess v. Reynolds	113 U.S. 73 (1885)	
Polleys v. Black River Improvement Co.	113 U.S. 81 (1885)	
Pullman Palace Car Co. v. Speck	113 U.S. 84 (1885)	
Griffith v. Godey	113 U.S. 89 (1885)	
Rowell v. Lindsay	113 U.S. 97 (1885)	
Findlay v. McAllister	113 U.S. 104 (1885)	
Central Railroad & Banking Co. of Ga. v. Pettus	113 U.S. 116 (1885)	An appeal regarding monies owed and a lein upon the roadbed, depots, side tracks, turnouts, trestles, and bridges owned and used by the appellants.
Steele v. United States	113 U.S. 128 (1885)	
Clawson v. United States	113 U.S. 143 (1885)	
Bicknell v. Comstock	113 U.S. 149 (1885)	
United States v. Mueller	113 U.S. 153 (1885)	
Consolidated Safety-Valve Co. v. Crosby Steam Gauge & Valve Co.	113 U.S. 157 (1885)	
Bryan v. Kennett	113 U.S. 179 (1885)	
Northern Liberty Market Co. v. Kelly	113 U.S. 199 (1885)	
Tucker v. Masser	113 U.S. 203 (1885)	
Cardwell v. American Bridge Co.	113 U.S. 205 (1885)	
Voss v. Fisher	113 U.S. 213 (1885)	
Price v. Pennsylvania Railroad Co.	113 U.S. 218 (1885)	
Dakota County v. Glidden	113 U.S. 222 (1885)	
Caillot v. Deetken	113 U.S. 215 (1885)	
Cheong Ah Moy v. United States	113 U.S. 216 (1885)	
Anderson County Commissioners v. Beal	113 U.S. 227 (1885)	
Harvey v. United States	113 U.S. 243 (1885)	
Central Railroad Co. of New Jersey v. Mills	113 U.S. 249 (1885)	
Presser v. Illinois	116 U.S. 252 (1886)	
Looney v. District of Columbia	113 U.S. 258 (1885)	
Nashville, Chattanooga & St. Louis Railway Co. v. United States	113 U.S. 261 (1885)	
Coon v. Wilson	113 U.S. 268 (1885)	
Spaids v. Cooley	113 U.S. 278 (1885)	
Sully v. Drennan	113 U.S. 287 (1885)	
Avegno v. Schmidt	113 U.S. 293 (1885)	title to mortgaged property confiscated by the U.S. government during the Civil War
Stone v. Chisolm	113 U.S. 302 (1885)	
Thornley v. United States	113 U.S. 310 (1885)	
Baylis v. Travellers' Ins. Co.	113 U.S. 316 (1885)	right to trial by jury in a civil case
Pneumatic Gas Co. v. Berry	113 U.S. 322 (1885)	
Ex parte Bigelow	113 U.S. 328 (1885)	
City of Quincy v. Jackson	113 U.S. 332 (1885)	
Town of Santa Anna v. Frank	113 U.S. 339 (1885)	
McArthur v. Scott	113 U.S. 340 (1885)	
Cannon v. United States	118 U.S. 355 (1885)	
Hyatt v. Vincennes National Bank	113 U.S. 408 (1885)	
United States v. Jordan	113 U.S. 418 (1885)	
Chicago & Northwestern Railway Co. v. Crane	113 U.S. 424 (1885)	
Prentice v. Stearns	113 U.S. 435 (1885)	
Morgan v. Hamlet	113 U.S. 449 (1885)	
Chase v. Curtis	113 U.S. 452 (1885)	
St. Louis, Iron Mountain & Southern Railway Co. v. Berry	113 U.S. 465 (1885)	
Morgan v. United States	113 U.S. 476 (1885)	
Provident Institution for Savings v. Mayor of Jersey City	113 U.S. 506 (1885)	
Union Pacific Railway Co. v. Cheyenne	113 U.S. 516 (1885)	
Erhardt v. Boaro, (113 U.S. 527)	113 U.S. 527 (1885)	
Erhardt v. Boaro, (113 U.S. 537)	113 U.S. 537 (1885)	
Richards v. Mackall	113 U.S. 539 (1885)	
Peugh v. Davis	113 U.S. 542 (1885)	
Gumbel v. Pitkin	113 U.S. 545 (1885)	
Fussell v. Gregg	113 U.S. 550 (1885)	
City of St. Louis v. Myers	113 U.S. 566 (1885)	
Brown v. United States	113 U.S. 568 (1885)	
Chicago Life Insurance Co. v. Needles	113 U.S. 574 (1885)	
Pearce v. Ham	113 U.S. 585 (1885)	
Ayers v. Watson	113 U.S. 594 (1885)	
California Artificial Stone Paving Co. v. Molitor	113 U.S. 609 (1885)	Patent infringement case on an improvement in concrete paving
Winona & St. Peter R. Co. v. Barney	113 U.S. 618 (1885)	Public land grant for Railroad construction
Kansas Pacific R. Co. v. Dunmeyer	113 U.S. 629 (1885)	Land ownership dispute
Schmieder v. Barney	113 U.S. 645 (1885)	case regarding description of articles subject to duty
Camp v. United States	113 U.S. 648 (1885)	case to recover an alleged balance due as compensation for collecting and delivering to the United States a large amount of cotton in bales which was captured and abandoned property
Maxwell's Executors v. Wilkinson	113 U.S. 656 (1885)	writ of error brought by the executors of a former collector of the port of New York to reverse a judgment in an action brought against him by the defendant in error to recover duties paid by them on imported iron
Flagg v. Walker	113 U.S. 659 (1885)	case where the deeds for several parcels of land were transferred from Flagg, who was in financial difficulty, to Walker in return for paying off Flagg's debts and profits from the sale against a mortgage for other property owned by Flagg.
Blake v. City and County of San Francisco	113 U.S. 679 (1885)	
Fourth National Bank of St. Louis v. Stout	113 U.S. 684 (1885)	
Boyer v. Boyer	113 U.S. 689 (1885)	
Soon Hing v. Crowley	113 U.S. 703 (1885)	
United States v. Indianapolis & St. Louis Railroad Co.	113 U.S. 711 (1885)	
Ex parte Fisk	113 U.S. 713 (1885)	
Cooper Manufacturing Co. v. Ferguson	113 U.S. 727 (1885)	
Carter v. Burr	113 U.S. 737 (1885)	
Gregory v. Hartley	113 U.S. 742 (1885)	
United States v. Steever	113 U.S. 747 (1885)	Prize amounts under the Prize Act of 1864.
Hardin v. Boyd	113 U.S. 756 (1885)	
Presser v. Illinois	116 U.S. 252 (1886)	Application of the Second Amendment to the states.
Railroad Commission Cases	116 U.S. 307 (1886)	contracts, police power, regulation of transport
Boyd v. United States	116 U.S. 616 (1886)	A law compelling a person to produce an invoice or other papers is an unconstitutional search and seizure under the Fourth Amendment and unconstitutionally compelled self-incrimination under the Fifth Amendment.
Yick Wo v. Hopkins	118 U.S. 356 (1886)	The Equal Protection Clause protects noncitizens from discriminatory state legislation; Facially neutral laws may still violate the Equal Protection Clause if enforced in a discriminatory manner.
United States v. Kagama	118 U.S. 375 (1886)	Federal court jurisdiction over crimes committed on Indian reservations
Santa Clara County v. Southern Pacific Railroad	118 U.S. 394 (1886)	Corporate personhood.
Wabash, St. Louis & Pacific Railway Company v. Illinois	118 U.S. 557 (1886)	Regulation of interstate commerce by individual states.
Ker v. Illinois	119 U.S. 436 (1886)	Legality of abduction of criminal suspect abroad.
Ex parte Bain	121 U.S. 1 (1887)	Federal indictments cannot be changed without resubmission to a grand jury.
Runkle v. United States	122 U.S. 543 (1887)	The president cannot delegate the power vested in him to pass finally upon the sentence when he is the only person to whom has been committed the judicial power of making a final determination.
The Telephone Cases	126 U.S. 1 (1888)	Patent law.
