= Central Railroad & Banking Co. of Georgia v. Pettus =

Central Railroad & Banking Co. of Ga. v. Pettus
- Supreme Court of the United States

Argued April 14–15, 1884 Decided January 5, 1885
- Full case name: Central Railroad & Banking Co. of Ga. v. Pettus
- Citations: 113 U.S. 116 (more) 5 S. Ct. 387; 28 L. Ed. 915; 1885 U.S. LEXIS 1658

Court membership
- Chief Justice Morrison Waite Associate Justices Samuel F. Miller · Stephen J. Field; Joseph P. Bradley · John M. Harlan; William B. Woods · Stanley Matthews; Horace Gray · Samuel Blatchford

Case opinion
- Majority: Harlan, joined by unanimous

Central Railroad & Banking Co. of Ga. v. Pettus, 113 U.S. 116 (1885), was a United States Supreme Court case involving a dispute over attorneys' fees. The case reached the Court on appeal from a federal trial court, where the parties were from different states. The case addressed whether attorneys who secured relief for unsecured creditors in equity proceedings were entitled under state law to an equitable lien on the property recovered in the litigation for reasonable fees. The Court held that such a lien was recognised, but reduced the compensation awarded.

The case arose on appeal from a decree of the Circuit Court of the United States for the Middle District of Alabama in favour of the appellee law firms Pettus & Dawson and Watts & Sons. The decree awarded them $161.21, with interest at eight per cent, and imposed a lien securing payment on railroad property operated by the appellant Georgia corporations. The property had previously belonged to the Montgomery and West Point Railroad Company, an Alabama corporation whose line ran from Montgomery to West Point, with a branch from Opelika to Columbus. The decree directed that the property be sold if the amount was not paid within a specified time. The dispute arose from earlier litigation in Alabama courts involving this and related railroad property.

== Summary ==
On September 1, 1870, the Western Railroad Company, an Alabama corporation, purchased and took possession of the railroad's main line, branch line, and other property from the Montgomery and West Point Railroad Company. One term of the purchase agreement required the Western Railroad Company to assume all of the seller's outstanding debts and obligations. The agreement also provided for the issuance of Western Railroad Company stock on a dollar-for-dollar basis in exchange for the seller's outstanding shares.

The arrangement further provided that the Montgomery and West Point Railroad Company would surrender its charter to the state, which it later did. At the time of the purchase, the seller's property and franchises were subject to two mortgages securing proposed bond issues, under which bonds were issued. The company also had outstanding unsecured bonds issued in 1866 and 1867. The Western Railroad Company had previously executed its own mortgage on its property and franchises to secure a separate bond issue that the present appellants later guaranteed.

On September 15 1870, the Western Railroad Company executed a mortgage to trustees Morris and Lowery covering its property and franchises, including assets acquired from the Montgomery and West Point Railroad Company. The mortgage secured a $200,000 bond issue, a substantial portion of which was later issued and guaranteed by the appellant corporations.

On March 31, 1874, the trustees filed suit in the Chancery Court of Montgomery County, Alabama, against the Western Railroad Company, the present appellant corporations, the surviving trustees under earlier mortgages executed by the Montgomery and West Point Railroad Company, and other parties. The suit sought a judicial sale of the Western Railroad Company's property, including assets it had acquired from the Montgomery and West Point Railroad Company.

On December 18, 1874, the court entered a final decree ordering a sale subject to existing mortgage liens. Property formerly owned by the Montgomery and West Point Railroad Company remained subject to liens in favour of its bondholders according to their respective priorities, while property of the Western Railroad Company was subject to liens securing bonds issued under its mortgage of September 15, 1868. The property was sold, and the present appellants became the purchasers.

On May 8, 1875, Branch, Sons & Co., H. P. Hoadely, and C. S. Plank—holding bonds of the (old) Montgomery and West Point Railroad Company not secured by mortgage—through Pettus & Dawson and Watts & Sons, their solicitors, exhibited a bill in equity in the same court against the present appellants, the Western Railroad Company, the Montgomery and West Point Railroad Company, and others. They sued for themselves and for all other creditors of the last-named company who should come in and make themselves complainants and contribute to the expenses of the suit. Such proceedings were had—the Georgia corporations appearing and making defense—that on May 1, 1877, a final decree was entered by which it was, among other things, adjudged that "the unsecured creditors of the Montgomery and West Point Railroad Company, to which class complainants belong, have a lien" upon the property transferred by it to the Western Railroad Company; that such lien was subordinate to those for the bonds issued under the several mortgages executed by the Montgomery and West Point Railroad Company that were outstanding and unpaid, but superior to that of the mortgage executed by the Western Railroad Company after its said purchase, so far as that mortgage covered the property of the Montgomery and West Point Railroad Company, and that the property of all kinds, belonging to the latter company, be sold to satisfy its debts according to priority.

The cause was referred to a register to ascertain and report the amounts due to the complainants and to such other unsecured creditors of the Montgomery and West Point Railroad Company as should prove their claims pursuant to the decree; also, the amounts due to holders of bonds issued under its several mortgages. Upon appeal by the two Georgia corporations to the Supreme Court of Alabama, that decree was affirmed. The register thereafter proceeded with its execution. Numerous parties, including the complainants, appeared before him and had their claims registered, the creditors in each instance retaining in their own custody the evidence of their respective demands. The aggregate amount of such claims was very large.

On April 15, 1879, the register had not yet made a report about the various claims. As a result, Pettus & Dawson and Watts & Sons filed a joint petition to the court. They alleged in substance that as solicitors employed by the complainants, Branch, Sons & Co., Hoadley, and Plank, they prepared and filed the original bill. They said they did this for themselves and all other unsecured creditors of the Montgomery and West Point Railroad Company. They further said all unsecured creditors should come in and contribute to the expenses of the suit until the litigation concluded and be represented by the same interests in the Supreme Court of Alabama. Moreover, they stated their relations to the suit were well known to the Georgia corporations during the whole period of the litigation. Pending the reference before the register, after the rights of complainants and all creditors of the same class had been established by the final decree, those corporations made a secret arrangement with their immediate clients, whereby the claims of the latter were paid in full, principal and interest, and whereby also Branch, Sons & Co. and their co-complainants agreed to withhold from their solicitors the fact of such settlement until the Georgia corporations could buy or settle all other claims of the unsecured creditors of the Montgomery and West Point Railroad Company; that "afterwards said two Georgia companies, defendants to this suit, did buy up or settle the other claims, which had been filed in the cause, under said decree," and, "either jointly or separately, thereby acquired possession and control of said claims so filed;" that they also purchased and settled a large amount of claims, which might have been, but were not, filed with the register; that at the time of such purchase, said Georgia corporations had actual notice that petitioners, as solicitors in that suit, claimed reasonable compensation for such services as they rendered in behalf of the unsecured creditors of the Montgomery and West Point Railroad Company (other than complainants) who should come in and take the benefit of the final decree, and also the benefit of any lien upon said property that should be declared in favour of those creditors, and that in equity they

"were the assignees of a part of each claim as filed to the amount of the reasonable value of the services rendered in said cause by petitioners for the benefit of each holder and owner of such claims respectively".

The prayer of the petition was that an account be taken of the sums thus due to them as solicitors representing the unsecured creditors of the Montgomery and West Point Railroad Company (except the complainants and other named creditors with whom they had special contracts for fees) who received the benefit of their services; that they be declared to have a lien for the value of such services on all the property of that company which had come into the possession of the Georgia corporations, and that so much of it as may be necessary for that purpose be sold to meet the amounts due them.

The register reported, on April 22, 1879, that there were then no bonds or claims in the registry, except one claim, filed in court, as to which he did not report because no one had appeared and requested that it be audited.

Subsequently, on April 24, 1879, the Georgia corporations presented their joint petition for the removal of the suit commenced against them by Pettus & Dawson and Watts & Sons (they being the only defendants to the petition filed by the latter) to the circuit court of the United States. In that court, it was docketed and, after the defendants' answer and proof taken, proceeded to a final decree. When the cause was removed from the state court, nothing remained for determination between the parties, other than the record, except the appellees' claim, as citizens of Alabama, to a lien upon the property in question owned by the two Georgia corporations.

== Findings ==
The court below did not err in declaring a lien upon the property in question to secure such compensation as appellees were entitled to receive, for according to the law of Alabama, by one of whose courts the original decree was rendered and by which law this question must be determined, an attorney at law or solicitor in chancery has a lien upon a judgment or decree obtained for a client to the extent the latter has agreed to pay him, or, if there has been no specific agreement for compensation, to the extent to which he is entitled to recover, viz., reasonable compensation for the services rendered. Ex Parte Lehman, 59 Ala. 632; Warfield v. Campbell, 38 Ala. 527. That lien could not be defeated by the corporations that owned the property, which had purchased the creditors' claims filed under the decree. The lien of the solicitor rests by the law of that state upon the basis that he is to be regarded as an assignee of the judgment or decree, to the extent of his fees, from the date of its rendition. This right of the solicitors is superior to any that the defendant corporations acquired after the decree by purchasing the claims of unsecured creditors.

It remained only to consider whether the sum allowed appellees was too great. The decree gave them an amount equal to ten per cent upon the aggregate principal and interest of the bonds and coupons filed in the cause, excluding those in respect of which there was, between appellees and complainants and others, special contracts for compensation. It is shown that the appellees had contracts with the complainants for small retainers and 5% of the sums realised by the suit. We perceive no reason for this discrimination against creditors who were not parties except by filing their claims after the decree. One-half the sum allowed was, under all the circumstances, sufficient.

== Decree reversal ==
The decree was reversed, and the cause remanded with directions to modify the decree to award to appellees only the sum of 580, with interest from March 7, 1881, with the benefit of the lien upon the property as established by the decree. Each party will pay its costs in this Court and one-half the cost of printing the record.

== See also ==
- List of United States Supreme Court cases, volume 113
