= Consolidated Safety-Valve Co. v. Crosby Steam Gauge & Valve Co. =

- Supreme Court of the United States

Argued December 10 – December 11, 1884 Decided January 19, 1885
- Full case name: Consolidated Safety-Valve Co. v. Crosby Steam Gauge & Valve Co.
- Citations: 113 U.S. 157 (more) 5 S. Ct. 513; 28 L. Ed. 939; 1885 U.S. LEXIS 1664

Holding
- Novelty sufficient to distinguish a patent from prior art can be suggested by facts demonstrating the practical value of the invention. Here, the fact that known versions of the invention were not used and the fact that the claimed invention was widely adopted quickly suggest that the claimed invention had some modicum of novelty that its contemporaries lacked.

Court membership
- Chief Justice Morrison Waite Associate Justices Samuel F. Miller · Stephen J. Field; Joseph P. Bradley · John M. Harlan; William B. Woods · Stanley Matthews; Horace Gray · Samuel Blatchford

Case opinion
- Majority: Blatchford, joined by unanimous

Consolidated Safety-Valve Co. v. Crosby Steam Gauge & Valve Co., 113 U.S. 157 (1885), was a United States Supreme Court case in which the court held that novelty sufficient to distinguish a patent from prior art can be suggested by facts demonstrating the practical value of the invention. Here, the fact that known versions of the invention were not used and the fact that the claimed invention was widely adopted quickly suggest that the claimed invention had some modicum of novelty that its contemporaries lacked. Thus, the patent was valid, and the other party was liable for patent infringement.

This case determined the validity of patent No. 58,294, granted to George W. Richardson September 25, 1866, for an improvement in steam safety valves. The patented valve was similar to prior art that existed when it was devised, but the court found that Richardson had added what was necessary to make it a success. The court described the comparison of Richardson's valves to the prior art as "only as the anatomy of a corpse resembles that of the living being" because the prior art did not see widespread use and, primarily, existed as a paper record. Thus, the gloss on the doctrine of equivalents that this case represents is sometimes referred to as the "paper patent doctrine", and the prior art is sometimes referred to as "corpse patents".

== Technical background ==
Richardson was the first person who made a safety valve which, while it automatically relieved the pressure of steam in the boiler, did not, in effecting that result, reduce the pressure to such an extent as to make the use of the relieving apparatus practically impossible because of the expenditure of time and fuel necessary to bring up the steam again to the proper working standard.

His valve was the first which had the strictured orifice to retard the escape of the steam and enable the valve to open with increasing power against the spring and close suddenly, with small loss of pressure in the boiler.

== Ruling ==
The direction given in the patent that the flange or lip is to be separated from the valve seat by about one sixty-fourth of an inch for an ordinary spring, with less space for a strong spring and more space for a weak spring, to regulate the escape of steam as required, is a sufficient description as matter of law, and it is not shown to be insufficient as a matter of fact.

Letters patent No. 85,963, granted to said Richardson January 19, 1869, for an improvement in safety valves for steam boilers or generators, are valid.

The patents of Richardson were infringed by a valve which produces the same effects in operation by the means described in Richardson's claims, although the valve proper is an annulus and the extended surface is a disc inside of the annulus, the Richardson valve proper being a disc and the extended surface an annulus surrounding the disc, and although the valve proper has two ground joints, and only the steam which passes through one of them goes through the stricture, while, in the Richardson valve, all the steam which passes into the air goes through the stricture, and although the huddling chamber is at the center instead of the circumference, and is in the seat of the valve, under the head, instead of in the head, and the stricture is at the circumference of the seat of the valve instead of being at the circumference of the head.

The fact that the prior patented valves were not used and the speedy and extensive adoption of Richardson's valve support the conclusion as to the novelty of the latter.

Suits in equity having been begun in 1879 for the infringement of the two patents, and the circuit court having dismissed the bills, this Court in reversing the decrees after the first patent had expired but not the second, awarded accounts of profits and damages as to both patents, and a perpetual injunction as to the second patent.

== Later developments ==
In later cases, courts clarified that there must be some "nexus" between the commercial success of the product and the patented subject matter for this sort of claim to survive the doctrine of equivalents.
