= Ex parte Fisk =

- Supreme Court of the United States

Argued January 6, 1885 Decided March 2, 1885
- Full case name: Ex parte Fisk
- Citations: 113 U.S. 713 (more) 5 S. Ct. 724; 28 L. Ed. 1117

Holding
- Federal rules of evidence control in actions at law in federal court, and they preempt state laws that allow discovery in analogous situations.

Court membership
- Chief Justice Morrison Waite Associate Justices Samuel F. Miller · Stephen J. Field; Joseph P. Bradley · John M. Harlan; William B. Woods · Stanley Matthews; Horace Gray · Samuel Blatchford

Case opinion
- Majority: Miller, joined by unanimous

Ex parte Fisk, 113 U.S. 713 (1885), was a United States Supreme Court case in which the court held that Federal rules of evidence control in actions at law in federal court, and they preempt state laws that allow discovery in analogous situations. Essentially, Francis B. Fogg brought suit in the New York trial court against Fisk to recover the sum of $63,250 on the allegation of false and fraudulent representations made by Fisk in the sale of certain mining stocks. The case was removed to federal court, and the state court ordered that the proceedings continue there under the rules of the state court. Fisk was held in criminal contempt when he declined to answer questions his attorney believed violated the Fifth Amendment. The Supreme Court vacated the contempt order because state courts do not have the authority to order federal courts to operate under state rules.

== Background ==
From that suit, the plaintiff obtained the following court order:

Ordered, that the defendant, Clinton B. Fisk, be examined and his testimony and deposition taken as a party before trial, pursuant to sections 870, 871, 872, 873, etc., of the Code of Civil Procedure, and that for such purpose he personally be and attend before the undersigned, a justice of this court at the chambers thereof, to be held in the new county courthouse, in the said City of New York, on the 31st day of January, 1883 at 11 o'clock in the forenoon of that day.

A motion to vacate this order was overruled, and the judgment affirmed by the Court of Appeals.

The defendant then appeared before the court and submitted to a partial examination, answering some questions and objecting to others, until, pending one of the adjournments of the examination, he procured an order removing the case to the circuit court of the United States. In that court, an order was made to continue the examination before a master, to whom the matter was referred. The defendant refusing to be sworn and declining to be examined, he was brought before the circuit court on an application for attachment for a contempt in refusing to obey the order.

Without disposing of this motion, the circuit court made another order, to-wit:

1. It is hereby ordered and adjudged that the motion to punish the said defendant for such contempt stand adjourned to the next motion day of this court, to-wit, on the 28th day of March, 1884."
2. It is further ordered that the defendant Clinton B. Fisk, be, and he is hereby, directed and required to attend personally on the 14th day of March, 1884, before the Honorable Addison Brown, one of the judges of this court at a stated term thereof at his chambers in the post office building in said City of New York at eleven o'clock in the forenoon of that day, then and there, and on such other days as may be designated, to be examined and his testimony and deposition taken, and continued as a party before trial, pursuant to section 870 et seq. of the Code of Civil Procedure, and for the purposes mentioned in said order of January 12, 1883, and February 12, 1884, heretofore made in this action."

The defendant appeared before the court in pursuance of this order and, stating that he was advised by counsel that the court had no jurisdiction to require him to answer in this manner to the questions propounded to him by the counsel for plaintiff, he refused to do so to avoid self incrimination. For this, on further proceeding, he was held by the court to be in contempt and fined $500 and committed to the custody of the marshal until it was paid. It is to be relieved of this imprisonment that he prays here the writ of habeas corpus.

== Decision ==
Justice Miller delivered the opinion of the court. He stated the facts as above recited and continued:

The jurisdiction of this Court is always challenged in cases of this general character, and often successfully. There can be no doubt of the proposition that the exercise of the power of punishment for contempt of their orders by courts of general jurisdiction is not subject to review by writ of error or appeal to this Court. Nor is there in the system of federal jurisprudence any relief against such order, when the court has authority to make them except through the court's making the order, or possibly by the exercise of the pardoning power.

This principle has been uniformly held to be necessary to the protection of the court from insults and oppressions while in the ordinary exercise of its duties and to enable it to enforce its judgments and orders necessary to the due administration of law and the protection of the rights of suitors.

When, however, a court of the United States undertakes by its process of contempt to punish a man for refusing to comply with an order which that court had no authority to make, the order itself, being without jurisdiction, is void, and the order punishing for the contempt is equally void. It is well settled now in the jurisprudence of this Court that when the proceeding for contempt in such a case results in imprisonment, this Court will, by its writ of habeas corpus, discharge the prisoner. It follows necessarily that on a suggestion by the prisoner that, for the reason mentioned, the order under which he is held is void, this Court will, in the language of the statute, make "inquiry into the cause of the restraint of liberty." § 752 Rev.Stat.

That the case as made by the petitioner comes, for the purposes of this inquiry, within the jurisdiction of this Court under the principles above mentioned is established by the analogous cases. Ex Parte Rowland, 104 U. S. 604; Ex Parte Lange, 18 Wall. 163.

But did the court transcend its jurisdiction in fining the petitioner for contempt? Or rather, did it have the power to make the order requiring him to submit to the preliminary examination? For if it had that power, it clearly could enforce obedience to the order by fine and imprisonment if necessary. The record of the entire proceeding in this branch of the case, both in the state court and the circuit court, is before us, and we are thus enabled to form an intelligent opinion on the question presented.

The power of the court to continue the examination of the defendant after the removal of the case into the court of the United States is asserted on two grounds:

1. That the order for his examination, having been made by the supreme court of New York under its rightful jurisdiction while the case was pending in it, is still a valid order, partially executed, which accompanies the case into the circuit court, and that in that court it cannot be reconsidered, but must be enforced.
2. That if this be not a sound proposition, the circuit court made an independent order of its own for the examination of the defendant, which order is justified by the principle that the Code of Civil Procedure of New York, under which both orders were made, is a part of the law governing the courts of the United States sitting within that state.

We will inquire into the latter proposition first, for the points to be considered in it lie at the foundation of the other also.

The general doctrine that remedies whose foundations are statutes of the state are binding upon the courts of the United States within its limits is undoubted. This well known rule of the federal courts, founded on the Act of 1789, 1 Stat. 92, Rev.Stat. § 721, that the laws of the several states, except when the Constitution, treaties, or statutes of the United States otherwise require or provide, shall be regarded as rules of decision in trials at common law, was enlarged in 1872 by the provision found in § 914 of the Revision. This enacts that

"The practice, pleadings, and forms and modes of proceeding in civil cases other than equity and admiralty causes in the circuit and district courts shall conform as near as may be to the practice, pleadings, and forms and modes of proceeding existing at the time in like causes in the courts of record of the state within which such circuit or district courts are held, anything in the rules of courts to the contrary notwithstanding."

In addition to this, it has been often decided in this Court that in actions at law in the courts of the United States, the rules of evidence and the law of evidence generally of the states prevail in those courts.

The matter in question here occurred in the court below in regard to a common law action. It was in regard to a method of procuring and using evidence, and it was a proceeding in a civil cause other than equity or admiralty.

We entertain no doubt of the decision of the Court of Appeals of New York that it was a proceeding authorized by the statutes of New York, under which, in a New York court, defendant was bound to answer. The case before us is eminently one of evidence and procedure.

Justice Miller went on to give an illustration from act of Congress prescribing rules of evidence in § 858 of the Revised Statutes, which read:

"In the courts of the United States, no witness shall be excluded in any action on account of color, or in any civil action because he is a party to or interested in the issue tried, provided that in actions by or against executors, administrators, or guardians in which judgment may be rendered for or against them, neither party shall be allowed to testify against the other as to any transaction with or statement by the testator, intestate, or ward unless called to testify thereto by the opposite party or required to testify thereto by the court." This act of Congress, when passed, made competent witnesses in the courts of the United States many millions of colored persons who were not competent by the laws of the states in which they lived, and probably as many more persons, as parties to suits or interested in the issues to be tried, who were excluded by the laws of the states. It has never been doubted that this statute is valid in all the courts of the United States not only as to the introduction of persons of color and parties to suits, but, in the qualification made by the proviso where its language differs from provisions somewhat similar in state statutes, the act of Congress, critically construed, has always been held to govern the court. Monongahela Bank v. Jacobus, 109 U. S. 275; Potter v. Bank, 102 U. S. 163; Page v. Burnstine, 102 U. S. 664; King v. Worthington, 104 U. S. 44.

Specifically the following sections of the Revised Statutes, in chapter XVII, on evidence:

1. SEC. 861. The mode of proof, in the trial of actions at common law, shall be by oral testimony and examination of witnesses in open court, except as hereinafter provided.
2. SEC. 863. The testimony of any witness may be taken in any civil cause, pending in a district or circuit court, by deposition de bene esse when the witness lives at a greater distance from the place of trial than one hundred miles, or is bound on a voyage to sea, or is about to go out of the United States, or out of the district in which the case is to be tried, and to a greater distance than one hundred miles from the place of trial, before the time of trial, or when he is ancient or infirm.
  The remainder of this section and §§ 864 and 865 are directory as to the officer before whom the deposition may be taken, the notice to the opposite party, and the manner of taking, testifying, and returning the deposition to the court.
3. SEC. 866. In any case where it is necessary, in order to prevent a failure or delay of justice, any of the courts of the United States may grant a dedimus potestatum to take depositions according to common usage, and any circuit court, upon application to it as a court of equity, may, according to the usages of chancery, direct depositions to be taken in perpetuam rei memoriam, if they relate to any matter that may be cognizable in any court of the United States.
4. Section 867 authorizes the courts of the United States, in their discretion and according to the practice in the state courts, to admit evidence so taken, and §§ 868, 869, and 870 prescribe the manner of taking such depositions, and of the use of the subpoena duces tecum, and how it may be obtained. No one can examine these provisions for procuring testimony to be used in the courts of the United States and have any reasonable doubt that, so far as they apply, they were intended to provide a system to govern the practice in that respect in those courts. They are, in the first place, too complete, too far-reaching, and too minute to admit of any other conclusion. But we have not only this inference from the character of the legislation, but it is enforced by the express language of the law in providing a defined mode of proof in those courts, and in specifying the only exceptions to that mode which shall be admitted.
  This mode is "by oral testimony and examination of witnesses in open court, except as hereinafter provided."

Justice Miller continued:

Of course, the mode of producing testimony under the New York Code which was applied to petitioner is not oral testimony and examination of a witness in open court within the meaning of this act of Congress. This obviously means the production of the witness before the court at the time of the trial and his oral examination then, and it does not mean proof by reading depositions, though those depositions may have been taken before a judge of the court, or even in open court at some other time than during the trial. They would not in such case be oral testimony. The exceptions to this section, which all relate to depositions, also show that proof by deposition cannot be within the rule, but belongs exclusively to the exceptions.

We come now to inquire if the testimony sought to be obtained from petitioner by this mode comes within the exception referred to in § 861. These exceptions relate to cases where it is admissible to take depositions de bene esse under § 863 or in perpetuam rei memoriam and under a dedimus potestatum under § 866.

In the first of these, the circumstances which authorize depositions to be taken in advance for use on the trial are mentioned with great particularity. They all have relation to conditions of the witness; to residence more than a hundred miles from the court, or bound on a sea voyage, or as going out of the United States or out of the district, or more than a hundred miles from the place of trial before the time of trial, or an ancient or infirm witness.

None of these things is suggested in regard to petitioner, nor were they thought of as a foundation of the order of the state court or of the circuit court. The statute of New York, under which both courts acted, makes no such requirements as a condition to the examination of the party. It is a right which, if the judge may possibly refuse to grant, he is in that matter governed by none of the conditions on which the deposition may be taken under the act of Congress.

Nor does the case come within the principle or profess to be grounded on the power conferred by § 866, which is another exception to the rule established by § 861. It is not according to common usage to call a party in advance of the trial at law and subject him to all the skill of opposing counsel to extract something which he may then use or not, as it suits his purpose. This is a very special usage, dependent wholly upon the New York statute.

Nor is it in any manner made to appear that this examination "was necessary in order to prevent a delay or failure of justice in any of the courts of the United States," nor is any such proposition the foundation of the court's action.

These are the exceptions which the statute provides to its positive rule that the mode of trial in actions at law shall be by oral testimony and examination of witnesses in open court. They are the only exceptions thereinafter provided. Does the rule admit of others? Can its language be so construed?

On the contrary, its purpose is clear to provide a mode of proof in trials at law to the exclusion of all other modes of proof, and because the rigidity of the rule may, in some cases, work a hardship, it makes exceptions of such cases as it recognizes to be entitled to another rule, and it provides that rule for those cases. Under one or the other all cases must come. Every action at law in a court of the United States must be governed by the rule or by the exceptions which the statute provides. There is no place for exceptions made by state statutes. The court is not at liberty to adopt them or to require a party to conform to them. It has no power to subject a party to such an examination as this. Not only is no such power conferred, but it is prohibited by the plain language and the equally plain purpose of the acts of Congress, and especially the chapter on Evidence of the Revision. The New York statute would, if in force, repeal or supersede the act of Congress.

The court found that if the acts of Congress forbid the use of this kind of testimony in the courts of the United States, no order for taking it made in the state court while the case was pending in that court, with a view to its use on a trial there, can change the law of evidence in the federal court. In that case, after it had been once heard on appeal in the Supreme Court of Illinois, it was removed into the circuit court of the United States.

A writ would be issued on application to the clerk.

== Later developments ==
The Federal Rules of Civil Procedure were adopted in 1938. These rules formally merged the separate systems of law and equity. The rules chose to handle the situation at issue in Fisk using the legal policy: they prohibited taking depositions and using interrogatories for discovery purposes.
