= Northern Liberty Market Co. v. Kelly =

- Supreme Court of the United States

Submitted January 5, 1885 Decided January 19, 1885
- Full case name: Northern Liberty Market Co. v. Kelly
- Citations: 113 U.S. 199 (more) 5 S. Ct. 422; 28 L. Ed. 948

Court membership
- Chief Justice Morrison Waite Associate Justices Samuel F. Miller · Stephen J. Field; Joseph P. Bradley · John M. Harlan; William B. Woods · Stanley Matthews; Horace Gray · Samuel Blatchford

Case opinion
- Majority: Gray, joined by unanimous

Northern Liberty Market Co. v. Kelly, 113 U.S. 199 (1885), was a writ of error to reverse a judgment for the defendant in an action brought on April 4, 1884, by a corporation formed for the purpose of erecting a markethouse in the City of Washington and carrying on a marketing business there, upon twenty promissory notes made by him to the plaintiff, dated January 1, 1875.

A twenty-year-old incorporated markethouse company with power to purchase, hold, and convey real or personal estate necessary to enable it to carry on its business, built a markethouse on land owned by it in fee simple, and sold by public auction leases for ninety-nine years, renewable forever, of stalls therein at a specified rent. The highest bidder for one of the stalls gave the corporation several promissory notes in part payment for the option of that stall, received such a lease, and took and kept possession of the stall, and afterwards gave it a note for a less sum in compromise of the original notes, and upon express agreement that if this note should not be paid at maturity, the corporation might surrender it to the maker and thereupon the cause of action on those notes should revive. Held that the new note was upon a sufficient legal consideration, and that the corporation, holding and suing upon all the notes, could recover upon this note only.

The judgment was rendered upon a case stated by the parties, in substance as follows:

The plaintiff offered for sale by public auction leases for ninety-nine years, renewable forever, of the stalls in the markethouse at a specified rent, the highest bidder entitled to an option on the stalls. The defendant was the highest bidder for a stall, and made part payment of the purchase money for the option of that stall, twenty notes for $171.05 each, and afterwards received from the plaintiff such a lease of that stall, and took and has since retained possession of the stall under the lease.

On August 5, 1881, the defendant, knowing the plaintiff's corporate existence was limited to twenty years, made and delivered to the plaintiff the note for $1,881.60, in compromise of the twenty original notes, and upon express agreement that if this note should not be promptly paid at maturity, the plaintiff might surrender it to the defendant, and thereupon the plaintiff's cause of action upon the original notes should revive. The note for $394.08 was made by William S. Cross, and guaranteed by the defendant, under like circumstances and in consideration of the surrender of two other notes similar in amount and consideration to the twenty notes before mentioned. All the notes in suit remain unpaid otherwise than by the giving of the note for $1,881.60, and all are still held by the plaintiff.

== See also ==
- List of United States Supreme Court cases, volume 113
