= Ayers v. Watson =

- Supreme Court of the United States

Argued November 11, 1884 Decided March 2, 1885
- Full case name: Ayers & Another v. Watson
- Citations: 113 U.S. 594 (more) 5 S. Ct. 641; 28 L. Ed. 1093

Court membership
- Chief Justice Morrison Waite Associate Justices Samuel F. Miller · Stephen J. Field; Joseph P. Bradley · John M. Harlan; William B. Woods · Stanley Matthews; Horace Gray · Samuel Blatchford

Case opinion
- Majority: Bradley, joined by unanimous

Ayers v. Watson, 113 U.S. 594 (1885), was an action of trespass to try title of certain land in Bell County, Texas, originally brought in the district court of that county by Watson, the defendant in error, against the plaintiffs in error and one Anderson.

== Background ==
The land was described in the petition as a tract lying in the County of Bell, about 15 miles (24 km) northeast by north from the three forks of the Little River. The defendants excepted to the petition for insufficiency of law, and pleaded not guilty. One of them, Frank Ayers, pleaded specially that he was owner in fee simple of a tract of eleven leagues granted by the government of Coahuila and Texas to Maximo Moreno in the year 1833, describing its metes and bounds, and he alleged that the land described in the plaintiff's petition, and claimed by him under some pretended land patent from the State of Texas to the heirs of one W. W. Daws, deceased, was embraced within the boundaries of said eleven-league grant, which was an elder and superior title.

Anderson also pleaded that he was occupying the Moreno grant as tenant of Ayers, and especially that 100 acres (0.40 km^{2}), including improvements, where he resided (describing its situation) was held by him under said Moreno title; that he had been in possession of said land for more than twelve months before the institution of this suit, adversely and in good faith, and he claimed the value of his improvements if the court should hold the plaintiff entitled to recover.

The plaintiff's original petition was filed in August 1877, and the amended petition and pleas were filed in April 1879. The cause was first tried in April 1879, and again in April 1880, and on both occasions the juries disagreed. Ayers then presented a petition for the removal of the cause to the circuit court of the United States, alleging that he was a citizen of the State of Mississippi and that the plaintiff was a citizen of Texas, and that there could be a final determination of the controversy, so far as he was concerned, without the presence of the other defendants as parties in the cause. The court granted the petition, and the cause was removed, no objection to the removal being made either then or in the circuit court afterwards. But after the issuing of the present writ of error from this Court, the plaintiffs in error, at the instance of one of whom (Frank Ayers) the cause was removed, assigned for error, among other things, that the circuit court erred in taking jurisdiction of the cause.

The statement in the first part of the charge that the jury should follow the tracks of the surveyor so far as they could be discovered, and when these were not to be found, they should follow the course and distance which he gives, so far as not in conflict with tracks that are found, was correct. Had this proposition been followed in the subsequent part of the charge, it would not have been open to criticism. But when directions were given to the jury in greater detail, they were not referred to the courses and distances given by the surveyor, if they were unable to identify his tracks -- that is, if the proof on the two hackberries was insufficient -- but they were told thus:

"You will from the whole proof so fix the unmarked or disputed lines called for in the grant as in your judgment most nearly harmonizes the calls with the known corners and the undisputed lines,"

and if not able to fix these lines in this way, then to resort to the rule of quantity. This was putting the matter as if it depended on the judgment of the jury whether the lines could be run according to the survey, whereas, if not compelled by fixed monuments -- such as the plaintiff claimed the hackberry trees to be -- to run the second, or back line, in a particular manner, there was nothing in the way, so far as the evidence showed, of running the first and second lines according to the field notes, only extending the second line so as to meet the east line, the position of which was known. If the northeast corner was not determined by the hackberries, there was nothing to interfere with the location of the Moreno grant in exact accordance with the field notes except the one thing of extending the second line far enough to meet the conceded location of the eastern boundary. It did not depend on anything requiring the exercise of judgment on the part of the jury; it was a matter of course. If the position of the eastern line had not been discovered at all, and nothing had been known but the beginning corner, the field notes would have furnished the only guide for locating the survey. The position of that line being known, it controlled the survey only in respect to that line, which required the second line to be extended sufficiently to reach it. But if the two hackberry trees in that line were also identified as the true northeast corner, then the position of the north line and the length of the first course would be controlled by those trees.

== Decision ==
The court thought there was error in not putting it to the jury with sufficient distinctness that the course and distance of the first two lines of the survey must govern if the evidence was not sufficient to fix the location of the northern line by identifying the two hackberries with those called for in the field notes for the northeast corner of the survey or by some other marks or monuments.

The judgment was reversed, with directions to grant a new trial.

== See also ==
- List of United States Supreme Court cases, volume 113
