= Peugh v. Davis =

- Supreme Court of the United States

Argued January 27, 1885 Decided March 2, 1885
- Full case name: Peugh v. Davis
- Citations: 113 U.S. 542 (more) 5 S. Ct. 622; 28 L. Ed. 1127; 1885 U.S. LEXIS 1704

Court membership
- Chief Justice Morrison Waite Associate Justices Samuel F. Miller · Stephen J. Field; Joseph P. Bradley · John M. Harlan; William B. Woods · Stanley Matthews; Horace Gray · Samuel Blatchford

Case opinion
- Majority: Miller, joined by unanimous

Peugh v. Davis, 113 U.S. 542 (1885), was a suit in equity for redeeming unoccupied and unenclosed city lots from a mortgage, continued from a case brought to the high court during the October 1877 term, (Peugh v. Davis, 96 U. S. 332) the question then was whether certain instruments of writing, made by Peugh to Davis constituted an absolute conveyance of lots in the District of Columbia or were in the nature of a mortgage security for loan of money. The court was of opinion that, on all the facts of the case, the latter was the true construction of the transaction between the parties. Respondent defended against complainant's claim to redeem by setting up that the alleged mortgage was an absolute conveyance. This being decided adversely, held that, in accounting as mortgagee in constructive possession, he was not liable for a temporary speculative rise in the value of the tract, which subsequently declined—both during the time of such possession.

In the prior case, the court below was directed to permit the plaintiff Peugh to redeem the property by the payment of the loan, with interest at six percent per annum, and, as it appeared that the defendant had taken possession of the property, it was said in the opinion that he "should be charged with a reasonable sum for the use and occupation of the premises from the time he took possession in 1865, and allowed for the taxes paid and other necessary expenses incurred by him."

Upon the return of the case to the Supreme Court of the District of Columbia, it was referred to an auditor to ascertain the sum necessary to redeem on that basis. Two reports were made, neither of which were entirely acceptable to the parties or to the court, which finally, by a decree in general term, allowed nothing for use and occupation by defendant, but did make an allowance for a sum received from the United States for its use, after deducting from this latter sum the amount paid to an agent for its collection.

- The appellant assigns for error that no allowance was made him for the use and occupation by defendant.
- The reply to this was that he never used and occupied it received any rents except the amount for which he is charged as received from the government.
- The lots were open, unenclosed, with no buildings on them, and no actual possession or use of them was had by the defendant. His possession was merely constructive under his interpretation of the contract, that the land was his own. The witnesses say it was worth nothing in its actual condition, and no evidence is given to the contrary.
- It was urged that a sum equal to the interest on the money borrowed by Peugh should be allowed as rent, or for occupation, from the time Davis asserted his ownership and possession. We can see no reason for this, and it would have been in conflict with the instruction contained in the opinion of this Court that he "should be charged a reasonable sum for the use and occupation." If this was worth nothing, that was the end of that matter.
- It was stated that during the period in question, the land rapidly rose in value and afterwards declined; that Peugh could have sold it, and probably was offered a sum for it which would have left him a large profit, and that he ought in this transaction to set off this loss against the amount he must pay to redeem.

This is not allowance for use and occupation. It is damages for a tort. It cannot be recovered in this suit, if it could be recovered in any.

The short answer to all this is that Mr. Peugh owed the money he had borrowed from Davis. What he is now claiming in the original suit is the right to pay the money and have a reconveyance of the land. Nothing hindered during all this time that he should pay this money, and if, as he alleges, Davis denied his right to do so, then he should have made a regular and lawful tender of the amount due.

If he had done so, the interest would have ceased to run against him, and the amount that he is now required to pay would have been diminished by more than one-half

An attempt was made to show that he did make this tender. Some evidence is offered that he told Davis that he was ready to account with him and pay what was due, and that he had the money with him.

But in order to make a tender that would have caused the interest to cease, he should have ascertained for himself the sum due, or have fixed upon a sum which was sufficient and then made a formal tender by counting out or offering that sum to Davis distinctly and directly as a tender.

The fact that he did not do this is the answer to all that he now claims in this Court. He has been permitted to redeem. His own assertion of that right has been allowed him; but if he ever had this money and was ready and willing to pay it, he did not do so. He did not produce or show it. He did not fix the amount he was ready to pay, but he took the money away with him, and used it himself, and there is no hardship in requiring him to pay six percent interest on it if he wishes to redeem the lots.

The decree of the Supreme Court of the district was affirmed.

== See also ==
- List of United States Supreme Court cases, volume 113
