= Brown v. United States =

Brown v. United States may refer to:

- Brown v. United States, 12 U.S. 110 (1814), another decision of the U.S. Supreme Court.
- Brown v. United States, 113 U.S. 568 (1885), a decision of the U.S. Supreme Court that granted pay owed to the estate of a deceased navy boatswain.
- Brown v. United States, 150 U.S. 93 (1893).
- Brown v. United States, 256 U.S. 335 (1921), a decision that rejected a duty to retreat in self-defense cases
- Brown v. United States, 602 U.S. __ (2024), a decision that held that drug offenses are classified based on the drug schedule at the time of the offense for purposes of the Armed Career Criminal Act

== See also ==
- Brown v. Board of Education, 347 U.S. 483 (1954), a landmark U.S. Supreme Court decision that held school segregation to be unconstitutional
