= Ex parte Bigelow =

- Supreme Court of the United States

Argued January 19, 1885 Decided February 2, 1885
- Full case name: Ex parte Bigelow
- Citations: 113 U.S. 328 (more) 5 S. Ct. 542; 28 L. Ed. 1005

Court membership
- Chief Justice Morrison Waite Associate Justices Samuel F. Miller · Stephen J. Field; Joseph P. Bradley · John M. Harlan; William B. Woods · Stanley Matthews; Horace Gray · Samuel Blatchford

Case opinion
- Majority: Miller, joined by unanimous

Ex parte Bigelow, 113 U.S. 328 (1885), was an application for a writ of habeas corpus to release the petitioner from imprisonment in the District of Columbia jail where he was held, as he alleges, unlawfully by John S. Crocker, the warden of the jail. He presents with the petition the record of his conviction and sentence in the Supreme Court of the District to imprisonment for five years under an indictment for embezzlement, and this record and the petition of the applicant present all that could be brought before the court on a return to the writ, if one were awarded.

== Background ==
The petitioner relies on a single point from the facts which occurred at the trial. Pending before the court, there were fourteen indictments against the petitioner for embezzlement as an officer of the Bank of the Republic; and an order of the court had directed that they be consolidated under the statute and tried together. A jury was then impaneled and sworn, and the district attorney had made a statement of his case to the jury, when the court took a recess. When the court reconvened a short time later, it decided that the indictments could not be tried together and so directed the jury to be discharged from further consideration of them, and rescinded the order of consolidation. The prisoner was thereupon tried before the same jury on one of those indictments and found guilty. All of this was against his protest and without his consent. The judgment was taken by appeal to the supreme court in general term, where it was affirmed.

It was argued that the impaneling and swearing the jury and the statement of his case by the district attorney put the prisoner in jeopardy with regard to all the offenses charged in the consolidated indictments, within the meaning of the Fifth Amendment of the Constitution, so that he could not be again tried for any of those offenses.

That amendment declares, among other things, that no person

shall be subject for the same offense to be twice put in jeopardy of life or limb, ... nor be deprived of life, liberty, or property without due process of law.

It is said, that the court below exceeded its jurisdiction, and that this Court has the power, in such case and for that reason, to discharge the prisoner from confinement under a void sentence. The proposition itself is sound if the facts justify the conclusion that the court of the district was without authority in the matter.

But that court had jurisdiction of the offense described in the indictment on which the prisoner was tried. It had jurisdiction of the prisoner, who was properly brought before the court. It had jurisdiction to hear the charge and the evidence against the prisoner. It had jurisdiction to hear and to decide upon the defenses offered by him. The matter now presented was one of those defenses. Whether it was a sufficient defense was a matter of law on which that court must pass so far as it was purely a question of law, and on which the jury under the instructions of the court must pass if we can suppose any of the facts were such as required submission to the jury.

Article V of the Amendments, and Articles VI and VII, contain other provisions concerning trials in the courts of the United States designed as safeguards to the rights of parties. Do all of these go to the jurisdiction of the courts? And are all judgments void where they have been disregarded in the progress of the trial? Is a judgment of conviction void when a deposition has been read against a person on trial for crime because he was not confronted with the witness, or because the indictment did not inform him with sufficient clearness of the nature and cause of the accusation?

== Decision ==
The high court confessed that it is not always very easy to determine what matters go to the jurisdiction of court so as to make its action when erroneous a nullity. But the general rule is that when the court has jurisdiction by law of the offense charged, and of the party who is so charged, its judgments are not nullities.

There are exceptions to this rule, but when they are relied on as foundations for relief in another proceeding, they could be clearly found to exist. In this case, no verdict nor judgment was rendered, no sentence enforced, and it remained with the trial court to decide whether the acts on which he relied were a defense to any trial at all.

The court was of the opinion that what was done by that court was within its jurisdiction. That the question thus raised by the prisoner was one which it was competent to decide, which it was bound to decide, and that its decision was the exercise of jurisdiction. Ex Parte Watkins, 3 Pet. 202; Ex Parte Parks, 93 U. S. 23; Ex Parte Yarbrough, 110 U. S. 653; Ex Parte Crouch, 112 U. S. 178.

Without giving an opinion as to whether that decision was sound or not, the court decided it could not grant the writ being asked for, and it was denied.
