= Cheong Ah Moy v. United States =

- Supreme Court of the United States

Argued January 9, 1885 Decided January 26, 1885
- Full case name: Cheong Ah Moy v. United States
- Citations: 113 U.S. 216 (more) 5 S. Ct. 431; 28 L. Ed. 983

Case history
- Prior: in re Ah Moy, 21 Fed. 785

Holding
- A habeas corpus petition seeking to prevent a deportation is moot after the petitioner has been deported.

Court membership
- Chief Justice Morrison Waite Associate Justices Samuel F. Miller · Stephen J. Field; Joseph P. Bradley · John M. Harlan; William B. Woods · Stanley Matthews; Horace Gray · Samuel Blatchford

Case opinion
- Majority: Miller, joined by unanimous

Cheong Ah Moy v. United States, 113 U.S. 216 (1885), was a case regarding a Chinese woman who—upon her arrival at a San Francisco port from China—was not permitted to stay in that city by reason of the Acts of Congress of May 6, 1882 (amended 1884). She was forcibly kept on board another vessel scheduled to sail back to China and had to have someone sue out a writ of habeas corpus to obtain her release. She was deported while the appeal was in progress, and the Supreme Court held that the deportation rendered the habeas petition moot. The case was also known as the The Chinese Wife Case.

== Background ==
Upon her arrest, the circuit court of the United States ordered that she be returned to the vessel in order to be carried back to China. She was placed in the custody of the marshal, who was directed to execute the order. But the marshal found that the original vessel had sailed, and so he placed his prisoner in jail for safekeeping until another vessel was at hand to remove her.

Her counsel, upon this state of facts, applied at the circuit court for permission to give bail on her behalf to have her released from custody. The judges of the circuit court were divided in their opinion on the question of granting the motion, and, after finally overruling the motion, certified their division to this Court.

In the meantime, on the second day of October, three days after an order was made overruling the motion, and ten days before a writ of error herein was filed in the clerk's office at the circuit court, the marshal already executed the original order of the court, placing the prisoner on board the steamship New York, one of the Pacific Mail steamships, then about to start for China; she departed on said vessel on the seventh day of October. It thus appears that the order of deportation had been fully executed, with the petitioner for the writ of habeas corpus still placed outside the jurisdiction of the court and of the United States, the execution of the order having transpired six days before the writ of error was filed in the circuit court and it being several days before a decision was issued. The question, therefore, was deemed a moot question regarding a plaintiff in error, for even if she was permitted to give bail it could be of no value to her as the order by which she was remanded had already been executed and she was no longer in the custody of the marshal or in prison.

== Decision ==
The Court dismissed the case as moot because she had already been deported. In an opinion by Justice Miller, the court said that it "does not sit here to decide questions arising in cases which no longer exist in regard to rights which it cannot enforce."
