= Boyer v. Boyer =

- Supreme Court of the United States

Argued January 9, 1885 Decided March 2, 1885
- Full case name: Boyer v. Boyer
- Citations: 113 U.S. 689 (more) 5 S. Ct. 706; 28 L. Ed. 1089

Court membership
- Chief Justice Morrison Waite Associate Justices Samuel F. Miller · Stephen J. Field; Joseph P. Bradley · John M. Harlan; William B. Woods · Stanley Matthews; Horace Gray · Samuel Blatchford

Case opinion
- Majority: Harlan, joined by unanimous

Boyer v. Boyer, 113 U.S. 689 (1885), was a suit in error brought in a state court of Pennsylvania for an injunction restraining the commissioners of Schuylkill County, Pennsylvania from levying a county tax for the year 1883 upon certain shares in the Pennsylvania National Bank, an association organized under the National Banking Act. The suit proceeds upon the ground that such levy violates the act of Congress prescribing conditions upon state taxation of national bank shares in this, that "other moneyed capital in the hands of individual citizens" of that county is exempted by the laws of Pennsylvania from such taxation. A demurrer to the bill was sustained and the suit was dismissed. Upon appeal to the Supreme Court of Pennsylvania, that judgment was affirmed on the ground that the laws of the state under which the defendants sought to justify the taxation were not repugnant to the act of Congress.

== Ruling ==
=== Construction of the act ===
The Court has had occasion to examine the provisions of the National Banking Act in several other cases recently determined; and from these cases may be deduced certain rules for the construction of that act:

1. That the words "at a greater rate than is assessed upon other moneyed capital in the hands of individual citizens" refer to the entire process of assessment, which, in the case of National bank shares, includes both their valuation and the rate of percentage on such valuation; consequently, that the act of Congress is violated if, in connection with a fixed percentage applicable to the valuation alike of national bank shares and of other moneyed investments or capital, the state law establishes or permits a mode of assessment by which such shares are valued higher in proportion to their real value than is other moneyed capital.
2. That a state law which permits individual citizens to deduct their just debts from the valuation of their personal property of every kind other than national bank shares, or which permits the taxpayer to deduct from the sum of his credits, money at interest or other demands to the extent of his bona fide indebtedness, leaving the remainder to be taxed, while it denies the same right of deduction from the cash value of bank shares operates to tax the latter at a greater rate than other moneyed capital.

These decisions show that in whatever form the question has arisen, this Court has steadily kept in view the intention of Congress not to permit any substantial discrimination in favor of moneyed capital in the hands of individual citizens as against capital invested in the shares of national banks. In People v. Weaver, the Court said:

As Congress was conferring a power on the states which they would not otherwise have had, to tax these shares, it undertook to impose a restriction on the exercise of that power, manifestly designed to prevent taxation which should discriminate against that class of property as compared with other moneyed capital. In permitting the states to tax these shares, it was foreseen that the states might be disposed to tax the capital invested in these banks oppressively. This might have been prevented by fixing limit on the amount. But Congress, with due regard to the dignity of the states and with a desire to interfere only so far as was necessary to protect the banks from anything beyond their equal share of the public burdens, said you may tax the real estate of the banks as other real estate is bank as the personal property of the taxed, and you may tax the shares of the bank as the personal property of the owner, to the same extent you tax other moneyed capital invested in your state. It was conceived that by this qualification of the power of taxation equality would be secured and injustice prevented.

=== Laws of Pennsylvania ===
The court then considered whether the laws of Pennsylvania, under which defendants propose to levy a tax for county purposes upon the plaintiff's shares of stock, are open to the objection that they violate the principle of equality which the act of Congress intended to establish between capital invested in such shares and other moneyed capital. By a law of that state passed March 31, 1870—upon which the defense mainly rests—it is provided

That all the shares of national banks, located within this state, and of banks and savings institutions incorporated by this state, shall be taxable for state purposes at the rate of three mills [subsequently four] per annum upon the assessed value thereof, and for county, school, municipal, and local purposes at the same rate as now is or may hereafter be assessed and imposed upon other moneyed capital in the hands of individual citizens of this state.

=== Act of June 10, 1881 ===
This brought the court to the Act of June 10, 1881, whereby mortgages, moneys owing by solvent debtors, whether by promissory note, penal or single bill, bond or judgment, articles of agreement and accounts bearing interest, except notes or bills for work and labor done, obligations to banks for money loaned, bank notes, shares of stock in banks, banking or saving institutions or companies, then or thereafter incorporated under any law of Pennsylvania, public loans or stocks except those issued by that state or the United States, money loaned or invested in any other state, and all other moneyed capital in the hands of individual citizens of that state are declared "to be, and are hereby, taxable for state purposes at the rate of four mills on the dollar of the value thereof annually, provided that all mortgages, judgments, and recognizances whatsoever, and all moneys due or owing upon articles of agreement for the sale of real estate, shall, after the passage of this act, be exempt from all taxation except for state purposes, provided the provisions of this act shall not apply to building and loan associations," the money loaned by them being subjected to the same tax as money loaned by individuals. By the second section of the same act, all corporations paying interest on a loan or loans, taxable for state purposes, whether secured by bond, mortgage, recognizance, or otherwise, are required to report to the Auditor General annually the amount of such indebtedness owned by residents of Pennsylvania, and to pay into the state treasury four mills upon every dollar of such indebtedness, such tax to be deducted by the corporation paying it from the interest on such indebtedness, whereupon "such indebtedness, whether secured by bond, mortgage, judgment, or otherwise, shall be exempt from other taxation in the hands of the holders thereof." Laws Penn. 1881, p. 99.

According to the high court:

Unless we greatly misapprehend the effect of this legislation, a very large amount of property, made subject by the act of 1844 to taxation for both state and county purposes, has since been relieved from the burdens of county taxation, while the imposition by the act of 1870 upon national bank shares of local taxation at the same rate as was at the latter date, or has been since, imposed upon other moneyed capital in the hands of individual citizens of the state, leaves such shares subject to taxation as provided in the act of 1844. The burden of county taxation imposed by the latter act has at all events been removed from all bonds or certificates of loan issued by any railroad company incorporated by the state, from shares of stock in the hands of stockholders of any institution or company of the state which, in its corporate capacity, is liable to pay a tax into the state treasury under the act of 1859; from mortgages, judgments, and recognizances of every kind; from moneys due or owing upon articles of agreement for the sale of real estate; from all loans, however made, by corporations, which are taxable for state purposes, when such corporations pay into the state treasury the required tax on such indebtedness.

As the present case comes before us upon demurrer to the bill, we have excepting the allegations of the latter, no means of determining the value of the capital thus exempted from the county taxation which is imposed upon capital invested in national bank shares. After referring to the acts of 1870 and 1881, the bill charges:

"That for the year 1881, as is shown by the public report and by the books of the Auditor General of Pennsylvania, the sum of $1,692,938.66 was paid into the state treasury as tax upon the capital stock of such corporations by them in their corporate capacity, which sum of money was paid upon a gross capital stock of the corporations paying the same of the value, approximately stated, of 564 millions of dollars."

"That it appears, as is shown by the books and published report of the Secretary of Internal Affairs for the year 1881, that the total valuation throughout the state for that year of"

"all mortgages, money owing by solvent debtors, whether by promissory note, penal or single bill, bond, or judgment, also all articles of agreement and accounts bearing interest, owned or possessed by any person or persons whatsoever (except notes or bills for work or labor done, and all obligations given to banks for money loaned and bank notes), and all public loans or stocks whatsoever except those issued by this state or the United States, and all moneys loaned or invested on interest in any other state, and all other moneyed capital in the hands of individual citizens of the state," "amounts to $74,931,765." "That for the same year, as is shown by the books and published reports of the Auditor General, a tax was paid into the state treasury upon corporation and municipal loans, not probably included in the foregoing sum, upon an aggregate valuation of $51,404,162.50."

"That by the provisions of section 1 of the Act of June 10, 1881 (P.L. 99), all mortgages, judgments, and recognizances whatsoever, and all moneys due or owing upon articles of agreement for the sale of real estate, were exempt from all taxation except for state purposes."

"That section 2 of said act of 1881 exempts from local taxation in the hands of the holders thereof all loans issued by corporations paying interest thereon where such corporations pay into the state treasury the state tax of four mills on each dollar thereof, and by Act of May 1, 1854 (P.L. 535),"

"all bonds or certificates of indebtedness of any railroad company incorporated by this commonwealth be, and the same shall be, liable to taxation for state purposes only."

"That the total paid-in capital of all the state banks and savings institutions in said commonwealth, other than national banks, as appears by the books and published reports of the Auditor General for the year 1881, is $7,161,740.68, while the total paid-in capital of the national banks located within said state in said year amounted to $57,452,051."

The demurrer, of course, admits these allegations of fact to be true. Their materiality is not affected by the circumstance that they are stated to appear, also, upon the books and published reports of the Auditor General and the Secretary of Internal Affairs of Pennsylvania. Upon such facts and in view of the revenue laws of the state, it seems difficult to avoid the conclusion that in respect of county taxation of national bank shares, there has been and is such a discrimination in favor of other moneyed capital against capital invested in such shares as is not consistent with the legislation of Congress. The exemptions in favor of other moneyed capital appear to be of such a substantial character in amount as to take the present case out of the operation of the rule that it is not absolute equality that is contemplated by the act of Congress; a rule which rests upon the ground that exact uniformity or equality of taxation cannot, in the nature of things, be expected or attained under any system. But as substantial equality is attainable and is required by the supreme law of the land in respect of state taxation of national bank shares when the inequality is so palpable as to show that the discrimination against capital invested in such shares is serious, the courts have no discretion but to interfere.

The Supreme Court of Pennsylvania, after referring to Hepburn v. School Directors as having involved the same question that is now presented and observing that the exemption is here as there only partial, says: "Not only is some other moneyed capital of a miscellaneous character taxable for local purposes, but all such capital of the same character as that which you desire to exempt -- that is to say, the shares of state banks and savings institutions."

Again: "The General Assembly has authorized the taxation of the shares of these banks in no other manner and at no higher rate than other capital of a similar character."

If by this language it is meant that an illegal discrimination against capital invested in national bank shares cannot exist where no higher rate or heavier burden of taxation is imposed upon them than upon capital invested in state bank shares or in state savings institutions, we have to say that such is not a proper construction of the act of Congress. Capital invested in national bank shares was intended to be placed upon the same footing of substantial equality in respect of taxation by state authority as the state establishes for other moneyed capital in the hands of individual citizens, however invested, whether in state bank shares or otherwise. As the act of Congress does not fix a definite limit as to percentage of value beyond which the states may not tax national bank shares, cases will arise in which it will be difficult to determine whether the exemption of a particular part of moneyed capital in individual hands is so serious or material as to infringe the rule of substantial equality. But unless we have failed to comprehend the scope and effect of the taxing laws of Pennsylvania, and unless the allegations of the bill be untrue, the present case is not of that class.

Our attention is called by counsel for the defendants to the fact that Pennsylvania derives probably her principal revenues from railroads, and therefore has good reasons to look to her interests as a commonwealth in respect to such improvements. To this fact he refers the legislation which makes railroad securities liable to taxation for state purposes only, and exempts them from local taxation. Upon like grounds, he defends the exemptions made, in respect of local taxation, in favor of the bonds and shares of other corporations that pay an annual tax into the state treasury. It is quite sufficient in respect of such matters to say that this Court has no function to deal with the considerations of public policy which control that commonwealth in the assessment of property for purposes of revenue. We have no duty beyond that of ascertaining the intention of Congress in its legislation permitting the several states to tax the shares of institutions organized under national authority for the purpose of providing a national currency secured by United States bonds. If the principle of substantial equality of taxation under state authority, as between capital so invested and other moneyed capital in the hands of individual citizens, however invested, operates to disturb the peculiar policy of some of the states in respect of revenue derived from taxation, the remedy therefor is with another department of the government, and does not belong to this Court.

We are of opinion that upon the allegations of the bill, the defendants should have been put to their answer. The facts may then disclose a case quite different from that made by the bill. What we have said relates to the case as now presented.

The judgment was therefore reversed and the cause remanded for further proceedings not inconsistent with this opinion.

== See also ==
- List of United States Supreme Court cases, volume 113
