= Cooper Manufacturing Co. v. Ferguson =

- Supreme Court of the United States

Argued October 23, 1884 Decided March 19, 1885
- Full case name: Cooper Manufacturing Company of Mount Vernon Ohio v. Ferguson
- Citations: 113 U.S. 727 (more) 5 S. Ct. 739; 28 L. Ed. 1137

Holding
- A single act of business done by a foreign corporation in a forum state does not justify an exercise of personal jurisdiction over that corporation by the state.

Court membership
- Chief Justice Morrison Waite Associate Justices Samuel F. Miller · Stephen J. Field; Joseph P. Bradley · John M. Harlan; William B. Woods · Stanley Matthews; Horace Gray · Samuel Blatchford

Case opinions
- Majority: Woods, joined by Waite, Miller, Field, Bradley, Harlan, Gray
- Concurrence: Matthews, joined by Blatchford

Cooper Manufacturing Co. v. Ferguson, 113 U.S. 727 (1885), was a suit regarding the legitimacy of a sale of a steam engine and other machinery in the State of Ohio.

== Background ==
The plaintiff, which was a corporation organized and existing under the laws of the State of Ohio, with its principal place of business at Mount Vernon, Ohio, on February 22, 1880, at the County of Larimer, in the State of Colorado, entered into a contract in writing of that date with the defendants, who were citizens of Colorado, by which it was agreed that the plaintiff should sell to the defendants, and deliver to them on the cars at Mount Vernon, in the State of Ohio, a steam engine and other machinery, in consideration whereof the defendants were to pay the plaintiff the price stipulated in the contract for such machinery.

A suit was brought by the plaintiff on August 10, 1880, to recover of the defendants damages for their breach of the contract.

The defendants, among other defenses, first pleaded that when the contract was entered into, the plaintiff had not filed the certificate required by Colorado § 23 of the act of 1877; and second, that at the time of making the contract, the plaintiff did not have a known place of business in the State of Colorado, and did not have an authorized agent or agents in the state upon whom process might be served.

The plaintiff demurred to both these answers because they did not state facts sufficient to constitute a defense to the action. Upon the hearing of the demurrer, the judges of the circuit court were divided in opinion, and the presiding judge being of opinion that the demurrer should be overruled, it was overruled accordingly, and the plaintiff electing to stand by its demurrer, judgment was entered against it dismissing its suit, and for costs. By the present writ of error, the plaintiff brings that judgment under review.

== Decision ==
The certificate of division of opinion recites the facts above set forth, and states the question upon which the judges differed to be:

Whether the tenth section of article sixteen [fifteen] of the Constitution of the State of Colorado, and the twenty-third section of an act of the General Assembly of the State of Colorado, passed in the year A.D. 1877, titled an 'Act to provide for the formation of corporations,' were, or either of them was, under all the circumstances stated, and the various acts passed by the Legislature of the State of Colorado, a bar in this action.

Justice Woods delivered the opinion of the Court:

The right of the people of a state to prescribe generally by its constitution and laws the terms upon which a foreign corporation shall be allowed to carry on its business in the state has been settled by this Court. Bank of Augusta v. Earle, 13 Pet. 519; Paul v. Virginia, 8 Wall. 168; Ducat v. Chicago, 10 Wall. 410. The plaintiff in error does not deny this right, but insists that upon a proper construction of § 10 of Article 15 of the Constitution of Colorado and of § 23 of the act of 1877, its contract with the defendants was valid, and that its suit should have been maintained.

As the clause in the Constitution and the act of the legislature relate to the same subject, like statutes in pari materia, they are to be construed together. Eskridge v. State, 25 Ala. 30.

The act was passed by the first legislature that assembled after the adoption of the Constitution, and has been allowed to remain upon the statute book to the present time. It must therefore be considered as a contemporary interpretation, entitled to much weight. Stuart v. Laird, 1 Cranch 299; Martin v. Hunter, 1 Wheat. 304; Cohens v. Virginia, 6 Wheat. 264; Adams v. Storey, 1 Paine, 90.

It must be conceded that if the contract on which the suit was brought was made in violation of a law of the state, it cannot be enforced in any court sitting in the state charged with the interpretation and enforcement of its laws. Bank of United States v. Owens, 2 Pet. 527; Groves v. Slaughter, 15 Pet. 449; Harris v. Runnels, 12 How. 79; Brown v. Tarkington, 3 Wall. 377; Davidson v. Lanier, 4 Wall. 447; Hanauer v. Doane, 12 Wall. 342; Wheeler v. Russell, 17 Mass. 258; Law v. Hodson, 11 East 300; Little v. Poole, 9 B. & C.192; Thorne v. Travelers' Insurance Co., 80 Penn.St. 15; Allen v. Hawks, 13 Pick. 82; Roche v. Ladd, 1 Allen 441; In re Comstock, 3 Sawyer 218.

So far as appears by the record, the plaintiff had no principal place of business, nor any place of business whatever, in the State of Colorado, and the making of the contract set out in the complaint was the only business ever done by it, or that it ever purposed to do, in that state.

The question, therefore, is whether, upon a true construction of the Constitution and statute, the making of the contract which the plaintiff seeks to enforce, was, under the circumstances stated, forbidden.

The contention of the defendant in error is that the prohibition against the doing of any business in the state by a foreign corporation except upon the prescribed condition includes the doing of any single and isolated act of business whatever. Thus broadly stated, is clear that the interpretation of the defendants cannot be sustained. In a case involving the construction of the statute, the Supreme Court of Colorado held that a foreign corporation might, without complying with the provisions of the statute, maintain an action in the courts of the state to recover damages for trespass to its real estate. The court said:

"The prohibition extends to doing business before compliance with the terms of the statute. We do not think this an abridgment of the right of a foreign corporation to sue. It extends only to the exercise of the powers by which it may be said ordinarily to transact or carry on its business. To what extent the exercise of these powers is affected we do not decide."

Utley v. Clark-Gardner Lodge Mining Co., 4 Colo. 369. So it is clear that the statute cannot be construed to impose upon a foreign corporation limitations of its right to make contracts in the state for carrying on commerce between the states, for that would make the act an invasion of the exclusive right of Congress to regulate commerce among the several states. Paul v. Virginia, 8 Wall. 168. The prohibition against doing any business cannot therefore be literally interpreted.

Reasonably construed, the Constitution and statute of Colorado forbid not the doing of a single act of business in the state, but the carrying on of business by a foreign corporation without the filing of the certificate and the appointment of an agent as required by the statute. The constitution requires the foreign corporation to have one or more known places of business in the state before doing any business therein. This implies a purpose at least to do more than one act of business, for a corporation that has done but a single act of business, and purposes to do no more, cannot have one or more known places of business in the state. To have known places of business, it must be carrying on or intending to carry on business. The statute passed to carry the provision of the constitution into effect makes this plain, for the certificate which it requires to be filed by a foreign corporation must designate the principal place in the state where the business of the corporation is to be carried on. The meaning of the phrase "to carry on," when applied to business, is well settled. In Worcester's Dictionary, the definition is: "To prosecute, to help forward, to continue; as to carry on business." The definition given to the same phrase in Webster's Dictionary is: "To continue, as to carry on a design; to manage or prosecute, as to carry on husbandry or trade." The making in Colorado of the one contract sued on in this case, by which one party agreed to build and deliver in Ohio certain machinery and the other party to pay for it, did not constitute a carrying on of business in Colorado.

The obvious construction, therefore, of the constitution and the statute is that no foreign corporation shall begin any business in the state, with the purpose of pursuing or carrying it on, until it has filed a certificate designating the principal place where the business of the corporation is to be carried on in the state and naming an authorized agent, residing at such principal place of business, on whom process may be served. To require such a certificate as a prerequisite to the doing of a single act of business, when there was no purpose to do any other business or have a place of business in the state, would be unreasonable and incongruous.

The case of Potter v. Bank of Ithaca, 5 Hill 490, tends to support this conclusion. The charter of the bank provided that its operations of discount and deposit should be carried on in the Village of Ithaca, and not elsewhere. The cashier discounted a note in the City of New York for the purpose of securing a demand due the bank, and the fact that the note was discounted in New York City was set up as a defense to a suit on the note. In giving judgment for the bank, Nelson, C.J., said the statute "obviously relates to the regular and customary business operations of the bank, and does not apply to a single transaction like the one in question." A similar ruling was made in Suydam v. Morris Canal & Banking Co., 6 Hill. 217. See also Graham v. Hendricks, 22 La.Ann. 523.

We base the conclusion that the demurrer to the defendant's answer should have been sustained upon the interpretation we have given to the constitution and statute, and do not find it necessary to decide whether their provisions invade the exclusive right of Congress to regulate commerce among the several states. We have examined all the cases cited by the defendants to support their interpretation. * In none of them was the statute construed similar in its language or provisions to the Constitution or statute under consideration, and the cases can have no controlling weight in the present controversy.

Justice Matthews and Justice Blatchford concurred, on different grounds from those stated in the opinion:

Whatever power may be conceded to a state to prescribe conditions on which foreign corporations may transact business within its limits, it cannot be admitted to extend so far as to prohibit or regulate commerce among the states, for that would be to invade the jurisdiction which, by the terms of the Constitution of the United States, is conferred exclusively upon Congress.

In the present case, the construction claimed for the Constitution of Colorado and the statute of that state passed in execution of it cannot be extended to prevent the plaintiff in error, a corporation of another state, from transacting any business in Colorado which of itself is commerce. The transaction in question was clearly of that character. It was the making of a contract in Colorado to manufacture certain machinery in Ohio, to be there delivered for transportation to the purchasers in Colorado. That was commerce, and to prohibit it except upon conditions is to regulate commerce between Colorado and Ohio, which is within the exclusive province of Congress. It is quite competent, no doubt, for Colorado to prohibit a foreign corporation from acquiring a domicile in that state, and to prohibit it from carrying on within that state its business of manufacturing machinery. But it cannot prohibit it from selling in Colorado, by contracts made there, its machinery manufactured elsewhere, for that would be to regulate commerce among the states.

In Paul v. Virginia, 8 Wall. 168, the issuing of a policy of insurance was expressly held not to be a transaction of commerce, and therefore not excluded from the control of state laws, and the decision in that case is predicated upon that distinction. It is therefore not inconsistent with these views.

In the opinion of the court, there was error in the judgment of the circuit court, the judgment should be reversed and remanded for further proceedings.

And it was so ordered.

== Later developments ==
The consent-like doctrines of how a state may establish personal jurisdiction over a corporation were abolished after International Shoe Co. v. Washington, which introduced the minimum contacts test.
