= Pneumatic Gas Co. v. Berry =

- Supreme Court of the United States

Argued January 7, 1885 Decided February 2, 1885
- Full case name: Pneumatic Gas Co. v. Berry
- Citations: 113 U.S. 322 (more) 5 S. Ct. 525; 28 L. Ed. 1003

Holding
- A company cannot avoid an interested director settlement or lease after acquiescing to it for seven years. A contract entered into by a corporation whose director had a conflict of interest is not invalid if the conflict was openly disclosed and there was no fraud.

Court membership
- Chief Justice Morrison Waite Associate Justices Samuel F. Miller · Stephen J. Field; Joseph P. Bradley · John M. Harlan; William B. Woods · Stanley Matthews; Horace Gray · Samuel Blatchford

Case opinion
- Majority: Field, joined by unanimous

Pneumatic Gas Co. v. Berry, 113 U.S. 322 (1885), was a case regarding a decree whereby a director of a corporation can be released by that corporation of all claims, equitable or otherwise, arising out of transactions under a contract between the corporation and the director made in excess of its corporate powers is valid, if made in good faith and without fraud or concealment.

In 1869 several individuals interested in a patent for the manufacture of illuminating gas, and gas machines known as "Rand's Patent," for the States of Michigan, Wisconsin, Illinois, and Iowa, agreed to unite their interests, obtain an act of incorporation from the Legislature of Illinois, and do business in Chicago.

They applied to the legislature of the state, and on 24 March following obtained an act duly incorporating them and their associates and successors under the name of the Illinois Pneumatic Gas Company. By its third section, the corporation was invested with power to manufacture and sell illuminating gas, to be made from petroleum or its products under the patents owned or to be owned by the company, or in which it may have any title or interest, issued or to be issued to A. C. Rand; also to manufacture and sell the works and machinery, with all needed materials and appliances for such manufacture, and to make assignments and grant licenses under the patents in the same manner and to the same effect as if the corporation were a natural person.

In September 1869, the corporators organized under the act of the legislature, adopted a set of bylaws for the management of the affairs of the company, and, pursuant to them elected a board of nine directors, with full control of its property and franchises, and a president, secretary, and treasurer and general manager. The defendant Joseph H. Berry was chosen as one of the directors, and Mahlon S. Frost was chosen treasurer and general manager. From this time until the first of June in the following year, 1870, the company carried on at Chicago the business of manufacturing gas machines.

But the business was not profitable, and the company ran in debt and became embarrassed. Judgments were recovered against it upon which executions were issued and levied upon its property. It was without money or credit or any available means of raising funds, and the forcible sale of its whole property was imminent.

Several leases were negotiated and extended and on March 15, 1876, the defendants made a third proposition to the directors for the adjustment of their business, which was accepted and incorporated into an agreement executed on that day. It transferred to the company the interest in the lease to Frost remaining in them, and stipulated to assign and transfer on demand all of the capital stock owned by them for the sum of $274, and the right to manufacture gas machines at some one place to be selected by them in certain named state, with the privilege of selling the machines. It stipulated to pay and deliver to the stockholders the moneys received from them under the contract of October 15, 1874, with interest thereon, and to deliver up such notes as they then held. And on the other hand, the company stipulated to pay to the defendants their proportion of any royalty that might be collected on the patents during the time the defendants owned stock in the company in the proportion that their stock bore to the whole stock of the company, and it released them from all claims, either equitable or otherwise, which it had by virtue of previous agreements or transactions.

The provisions of this agreement were fully carried out by the defendants. They paid over to the several stockholders the money, and surrendered the notes they had received under the agreement of October 15, 1874, and interest on the money. Notwithstanding this settlement and the release of the company thereby executed, the present bill was filed by it in September 1877, upon instructions of its board of directors to cancel the lease and contracts, to charge the defendants as trustees, and compel them to account for the property received from the company and profits made by them in their business under the lease. It set forth the lease and the transactions we have mentioned, and charges that they were made in excess of the authority of the directors, and were therefore null and void; that it was a breach of duty on their part to make the lease to Frost and on his part to receive it, he being the treasurer and general manager of the company, and also that the release was invalid because the defendants then had in their possession, unaccounted for, the sum of at least $60,000 derived from their business under the lease, which belonged to the company.

The answer of the defendants explained the agreements and transactions with the company, its insolvent condition when the lease was made, the repeated offers to return the property and turn over the business to the company, and the final settlement and execution of the release of the company by the agreement of March 15, 876. The lease to Frost and the contracts and transactions between the parties were fully disclosed by the proofs produced, and the court held, after full consideration, that under the embarrassed circumstances in which the company was placed at the time, judgments being rendered against it and executions levied upon its property, which was about to be sold, the lease was a valid transaction. Had it not been made, said the court, and the money furnished by the defendants to meet the liabilities of the company, its whole property would have been sacrificed and its business entirely broken up, and though Frost, to whom the lease was made, was at the time a director of the corporation, that fact of itself was not sufficient ground to set aside the contract, it being made to protect the interests or the company, and without any fraudulent design on his part. The court also held that it ought not to set aside the lease for other reasons—namely that it had been executed over seven years before any objection was made to it, and had during this time been repeatedly ratified, and that the release executed under the agreement of March 15, 1876, was a full and final settlement of the matters and claims between the parties, there being no evidence that the settlement was obtained by fraud or any improper conduct of either party. The court therefore dismissed the bill, and from its decree the cause is brought by appeal to this Court.

A court of equity does not listen with much satisfaction to the complaints of a company that transactions were illegal which had its approval, which were essential to its protection, and the benefits of which it has fully received. Complaints that its own directors exceeded their authority come with ill grace when the acts complained of alone preserved its existence.

But it is not necessary to rest our judgment of affirmance of the decree of the court below upon any consideration of the character of those transactions. After seven years' acquiescence in the lease, something more must be shown than that it was executed in excess of the powers of the directors before the lessee will be required to surrender the profits he has made under it. The lease expired June 1, 1874; the disposition of the property was settled by the agreement of March 15, 1876, and the release is an answer to all claims for the profits made by the defendants. The release is of itself sufficient to justify the dismissal of the bill. There is no evidence that it was obtained upon any fraudulent representations. Nothing was kept from the parties when it was executed. Indeed, all the transactions between the defendants and the company, from the time they took from Frost an assignment of the lease, were open and well known. There was no concealment, either had or attempted, of anything that was done, and no just reason can be given for disturbing the settlement made.

The decree was affirmed.
