= United States v. Jordan =

- Supreme Court of the United States

Argued January 26, 1885 Decided March 2, 1885
- Full case name: United States v. Jordan
- Citations: 113 U.S. 418 (more) 5 S. Ct. 585; 28 L. Ed. 1013

Court membership
- Chief Justice Morrison Waite Associate Justices Samuel F. Miller · Stephen J. Field; Joseph P. Bradley · John M. Harlan; William B. Woods · Stanley Matthews; Horace Gray · Samuel Blatchford

Case opinion
- Majority: Blatchford, joined by unanimous

United States v. Jordan, 113 U.S. 418 (1885), was a Supreme Court of the United States case regarding an Act of Congress that involved tax refunds. Specifically, it provided for the refunding to the persons therein named of the amount of taxes assessed upon and collected from them contrary to the provisions of the regulations therein mentioned. In other words, pay to each of such persons the sum set opposite his name, each of them is entitled to be paid the whole of that sum, and no discretion is vested in the Secretary of the Treasury or in any court to determine whether the sum specified was or was not the amount of a tax assessed contrary to the provisions of such regulations.

On the 29 July 1882, an Act of Congress was passed, 22 Stat. 723, c. 359, providing

That the Secretary of the Treasury be, and he is hereby, authorized and directed to remit, refund, and pay back, out of any moneys in the Treasury not otherwise appropriated, to the following named citizens of Tennessee, or the legal representatives of such as are deceased, the amount of taxes assessed upon and collected from the said named persons contrary to the provisions of the regulations issued by the Secretary of the Treasury, under date of June twenty-first, eighteen hundred and sixty-five, and published in special circular number sixteen, from the internal revenue office, of that date, said refunding having been recommended by the Secretary of the Treasury, under date of June nineteenth, eighteen hundred and seventy-three...

This was followed by the names of 81 persons, and the specification of a sum of money opposite each name.

The Secretary of the Treasury sent the Commissioner of Internal Revenue the following letter on June 19, 1873, which is referred to in the act of Congress:

TREASURY DEPARTMENT, OFFICE OF THE SECRETARY

WASHINGTON, June 19, 1873

SIR: I have considered the claim of William Gosling and others, applicants for refunding taxes alleged to have been illegally collected, included in schedule No. 243, from your office, and am of opinion that under the existing laws, the taxes paid by these parties were legally paid, and should not be refunded. But I fully recognize the hardship of the case, and desire that such claimants may receive relief from Congress. I have therefore to suggest that you will, in your next annual report or on any other occasion which you may deem more fitting, recommend the passage of a special act authorizing the refunding of all taxes paid by residents of the insurrectionary states which, under department circular of June 21, 1865, should not have been collected, such refunding to be made whether the tax in question was collected before or after the issue of the circular.

I am, very respectfully,

WILLIAM A. RICHARDSON

Secretary of the Treasury

The brief for the United States stated that the payment was refused by the accounting officers of the Treasury on the grounds that the statute authorized payment of only

"so much of the sum named as might be determined at the Treasury to represent the amount of taxes assessed and collected contrary to the regulations of the Secretary of the Treasury named in the act," and that the sum paid to the claimant was the sum total of the taxes that had been improperly collected from him. From the published decision of the First Comptroller in the case, 3 Lawrence's December 274, the ground of refusal appears to have been the one above stated, and the opinion of the Court of Claims in this case shows that such ground was urged before that court and rejected.

The view taken by the Treasury officers was that the annual income tax for the year 1863, under the Act of July 1, 1862, became, by the statute, due and payable May 1, 1864, before the assessment division that comprised Rutherford County was established, and under the Treasury regulations of June 21, 1865, in circular No. 16, which required collection only of the first taxes due after the establishment of assessment divisions. That sum was collected contrary to the provisions of those regulations, and was to be refunded, though it was collected before the date of the circular. The Treasury officers decided, however, that the money, paid for the special income tax under the joint resolution of July 4, 1864, and which, by law, did not become due until October 1, 1864, after the establishment of such assessment division, was not collected contrary to the provisions of those regulations, and should not be refunded.

The Court of Claims held that the statute did not admit of that interpretation, nor leave open any question for the court or for the accounting officers of the Treasury, except the identity of the claimants with the persons named in it, and that its language, taken together, was too clear to admit of doubt, that Congress undertook, as it had a right to do, to determine not only what citizens of Tennessee by name should have relief, but also the exact amount that should be paid to each one of them. We concur in this view. The act authorized and directed the Secretary of the Treasury to pay to the several persons named the respective sums named.

The court found that it was not an improper inference from the language of the statute that Congress intended to refund the taxes covered by the recommendation of the Secretary of the Treasury, in his letter of June 19, 1873. That letter covers taxes described as those that under the circular "...should not have been collected," though collected before it was issued. Congress may therefore have included some taxes collected before the circular was issued, but that it thought should not have been, or ought not to have been collected, in the sense intended by the Secretary.

The judgment of the Court of Claims was affirmed.

== See also ==
- List of United States Supreme Court cases, volume 113
