= Hollister v. Benedict & Burnham Manufacturing Co. =

Hollister v. Benedict & Burnham Mfg. Co.
- Supreme Court of the United States

Argued November 11–12, 1884 Decided January 5, 1885
- Full case name: Hollister v. Benedict & Burnham Mfg. Co.
- Citations: 113 U.S. 59 (more) 5 S. Ct. 717; 28 L. Ed. 901; 1885 U.S. LEXIS 1651

Court membership
- Chief Justice Morrison Waite Associate Justices Samuel F. Miller · Stephen J. Field; Joseph P. Bradley · John M. Harlan; William B. Woods · Stanley Matthews; Horace Gray · Samuel Blatchford

Case opinion
- Majority: Matthews, joined by unanimous

Hollister v. Benedict & Burnham Mfg. Co., 113 U.S. 59 (1885), was an American bill regarding alleged infringement on a patent issued to Edward A. Locke for specific improvements in identifying revenue marks. The defendants, Benedict & Burnham Manufacturing Company of Waterbury, were assignees of the patentee, and the plaintiff was the collector of internal revenue for the Second collection district of Connecticut. The court ruled that, while the improvement was useful, it was not novel enough to be a patent.

== Background ==
The patent was for a device that was designed specifically for sealing liquor casks with identifying marks or labels for tax purposes and for identifying the contents of the cask, and any other pertitent information. It was designed so that the marks and labels could not be fraudulently removed. There were two pieces, one to be retained by the government, the other meant to stay affixed to the cask.

In 1875 new regulations in regard to the use of tax-paid stamps, by which a portion of the stamp is cut out at the time of dumping and returned with the gauger's report, was adopted. This method effectually destroys the stamp and prevents its reuse, while, at the same time, a sufficient mount of the engraving is shown upon the slip to determine whether the stamp is genuine. It was believed that this system afforded the government an effective means of protection against fraud in connection with the collection of distilled spirit taxes.

== Decision ==
The court observed that while there was an increased utility beyond previous devices, there was no observable change in the character of the stamp, the identifying marks, nor the purpose of destroying the stamp while retaining the evidence of the stamp's purpose and "seems to us not to spring from that intuitive faculty of the mind put forth in the search for new results or new methods, creating what had not before existed, or bringing to light what lay hidden from vision; but, on the other hand, to be the suggestion of that common experience which arose spontaneously, and by a necessity of human reasoning, in the minds of those who had become acquainted with the circumstances with which they had to deal."

"Cutting out a portion of the stamp, as a means of defacing and mutilating it so as to prevent a second use, was matter of common knowledge and practice before the date of this patent; and cutting out a particular portion on which the identifying marks had been previously written or printed was simply cutting a stub from the stamp instead of cutting the stamp from the stub, as before."

The court mentioned a flaw in the system whereby frauds were committed by the "removal of tax-paid stamps from packages on which they had been originally placed by the officer to others surreptitiously substituted for them, or by emptying the packages of their original contents and fraudulently refilling them with spirits on which had not been paid, attracted the general attention of the revenue department, the answer to the problem of prevention was found by immediate inference from the existing regulations, in the adoption of the expedient now in question."

"As soon as the mischief became apparent, and the remedy was seriously and systematically studied by those competent to deal with the subject, the present regulation was promptly suggested and adopted; just as a skilled mechanic, witnessing the performance of a machine, inadequate by reason of some defect, to accomplish the object for which it had been designed, by the application of his common knowledge and experience perceives the reason of the failure and supplies what is obviously wanting. It is but the display of the expected skill of the calling, and involves only the exercise of the ordinary faculties of reasoning upon the materials supplied by a special knowledge, and the facility of manipulation which results from its habitual and intelligent practice; and is in no sense the creative work of that inventive faculty which it is the purpose of the constitution and the patent laws to encourage and reward. On this ground the decree of the circuit court is reversed, and the cause remanded, with directions to enter a decree dismissing the bill; and it is so ordered."

== See also ==
- List of United States Supreme Court cases, volume 113
