= West Line =

West Line or Westline may refer to:

- West Line (C-Train), a railway line in Calgary, Alberta, Canada
- West Line, Chennai Suburban, a railway line in India
- West Line, Missouri, a village in Cass County, USA
- West Line Historic District (Austin, Texas)
- Milwaukee District West Line, Metra commuter rail line, United States
- Union Pacific West Line, Metra commuter rail line, United States
- Westline, a fictional line describing the movement of the commercial centre of maritime trade over the past 5000 years
- Westline Township, Redwood County, Minnesota, USA

== See also ==
- Western Line (disambiguation)
- Western Railway (disambiguation)
