= Western Railway =

Western Railway may refer to:

- Western Railway (Austria)
- Hanoverian Western Railway, Germany
- Western Railway zone, on Indian Railways
- Württemberg Western Railway, Germany

== See also ==
- Westbahn (company)
- Western Railroad (disambiguation)
- West Line (disambiguation)
- Western Line (disambiguation)
- Great Western Railway, England
- West Coast Wilderness Railway, Tasmania
- Western Railway Corridor, Ireland
- Western Railway Museum, California, United States
- West Zone (Bangladesh Railway)
