= Western Line =

Western line may refer to:

== Australia ==
- Western Line, Tasmania
- Western railway line, Queensland
- Western standard gauge line, Victoria, part of the Melbourne–Adelaide railway
- Main Western railway line, New South Wales, railway line in Western Sydney & Western NSW
- T1 North Shore & Western Line, passenger rail service in Sydney

== Elsewhere ==
- Western Line (Mumbai Suburban Railway), of the Mumbai Suburban Railway in Mumbai, India
- Western Line, Taiwan, a railway line through Taiwan
- Western Line (Auckland), a railway line in Auckland, New Zealand
- Linha do Oeste (English: Western Line), a railway line connecting Lisbon to Figueira da Foz, in Portugal

== See also ==
- West Line (disambiguation)
- Western Railway (disambiguation)
