= Brown v. United States (1885) =

- Supreme Court of the United States

Argued January 13, 1885 Decided March 2, 1885
- Full case name: Brown, Administratrix v. United States
- Citations: 113 U.S. 568 (more) 5 S. Ct. 648; 28 L. Ed. 1079

Court membership
- Chief Justice Morrison Waite Associate Justices Samuel F. Miller · Stephen J. Field; Joseph P. Bradley · John M. Harlan; William B. Woods · Stanley Matthews; Horace Gray · Samuel Blatchford

Case opinion
- Majority: Woods, joined by unanimous

Brown v. United States, 113 U.S. 568 (1885), was an appeal from the Court of Claims regarding one James Brown, the intestate of the appellant, who was a boatswain in the United States Navy. The petition in this case was filed against the United States by the administratrix of his estate in the Court of Claims to recover a balance of pay which she alleged was due to Brown at his death.

The Court of Claims found the following facts:

The decedent Brown, was appointed a boatswain in the US Navy, January 4, 1862. On October 22, 1872, the Naval Retiring Board, before which he had been ordered by the Secretary of the Navy under the provisions of § 23 of the Act of August 3, 1861, 12 Stat. 291, reported that he was incapacitated from performing the duties of his office, and that there was no evidence that such incapacity was the result of any incident of the service. He was accordingly, upon the day last mentioned, by order of the President, retired on furlough pay. From October 22, 1872, to June 30, 1875, Brown received pay at the rate of $900 per annum, and from July 1, 1875, to June 6, 1879, at the rate of $500 per annum. On the day last named, he died.

The court also found that the Acts of August 3, 1861, 12 Stat. 290, and of December 21, 1861, 12 Stat. 329, were soon after their enactment construed by the President and Navy Department to include warrant officers, and under that construction it had been the uniform practice of the President to place warrant officers on the retired list, and large numbers of these officers had been so retired. No protest or objection was made by Brown during his lifetime, either to his retirement or rate of pay. The accounting officers of the Treasury had uniformly held that longevity pay to retired officers was not authorized by § 1593 of the Revised Statutes.

From these findings of fact the Court of Claims deduced, as a conclusion of law, that Brown was legally placed on the retired list, and had received the full amount of pay allowed him by law, and was not entitled to recover, and entered judgment dismissing the petition. The appeal of the petitioner brings that judgment under review.

The appellant asserted that the law applied only to commissioned officers, and not to warrant officers, to which latter class Brown belonged.

The question, however, was not a new one, and the findings showed that soon after the enactment of the act, the President and the Navy Department construed the section to include warrant as well as commissioned officers, and that they have since that time uniformly adhered to that construction, and that under its provisions, large numbers of warrant officers have been retired. This contemporaneous and uniform interpretation is entitled to weight in the construction of the law, and in a case of doubt ought to turn the scale.

The appellant next contended that the retirement of Brown was illegal because, at the time of his retirement, no officer could be placed on the retired list for disability not originating in the line of duty.

The theory behind this contention is this: the statute required that all officers retired for disability or incompetency not resulting from long and faithful service or wounds or injuries received in the line of duty or from sickness or exposure therein should be retired on furlough pay, and, as §§ 3, 5, and 19 of the Naval Appropriation Act of July 15, 1870, 16 Stat. 321, abolished the furlough pay list, the President was only authorized to retire Brown wholly from the service with one year's pay. The court thought it was clear that the sections of the statute referred to were not intended to abolish the furlough pay list. So far as they refer to retired officers, they apply to the retired list, and not the retired list on furlough pay. For thirty years, the legislation of Congress has divided retired naval officers into two classes. By § 2 of the Act of February 28, 1855, 10 Stat. 616, the officers on the retired, or, as it was then designated, reserved list were divided into those entitled to receive leave of absence pay and those entitled to receive furlough pay.

The distinction between the two classes of retired officers has been preserved down to the present time. By § 23 of the Act of August 3, 1861, 12 Stat. 290, 291, under which Brown retired, provided that officers incapacitated for active service from long service, wounds, etc., should be placed on the list of retired officers, but those incapacitated from other causes should be retired upon furlough pay. So, by § 2 of the Act approved July 28, 1866, 14 Stat. 345, it was provided that the rate of pay of officers of the navy on the retired list and not on duty nor retired on furlough pay, should be one-half the pay to which such officers would be entitled if on duty at sea.

This legislation has been reproduced in the Revised Statutes, where the distinction between officers on the retired list and officers on the retired list on furlough pay is preserved. Thus, §§ 1588 and 1592 prescribe one rate of pay for retired officers, and § 1593 a different rate for officers on the retired list on furlough pay, and § 1594 authorizes the President, by and with the advice and consent of the Senate, to transfer any officer of the navy on the retired list from the furlough to the retired pay list. It is plain, therefore, that section 5 of the Act of July 15, 1870, relied on by appellant and which is the only one which refers to the pay of retired officers, applies in both its terms and meaning only to the pay of officers on the retired list, and not to the compensation of officers retired on furlough pay, to which class Brown belonged, and did not abolish the furlough pay list. The order of the President retiring Brown on furlough pay was therefore made strictly in accordance with the provisions of the statute then and still in force.

It was next objected that the order of the President retiring Brown was illegal and void because the retiring board, having reported him incapacitated, did not find and report what was the cause of his incapacity, but only that there was no evidence that it was the result of any incident of the service. But as it is incumbent on the officer whose case comes before a retiring board to show, in order to secure a report which will entitle him to be placed on the retired list rather than on the retired list on furlough pay, that his incapacity was the result of some incident of the service, the report of the board that there was no evidence to support such a finding is to all intents and purposes a report that the incapacity was not the result of an incident of the service, and justifies an order retiring the officer on furlough pay.

The court's opinion was that the order of the President retiring Brown was authorized by law, and was regular and valid.

Appellant next insists that, conceding the retirement of Brown to be valid, he did not receive, after July 1, 1875, the pay to which he was entitled.

However, in the court's opinion, Brown was paid in his lifetime all that he was entitled to receive under the laws then in force. The judgment of the Court of Claims dismissing his petition was therefore right, and was affirmed.

== See also ==
- List of United States Supreme Court cases, volume 113
