= Western Railroad =

The following railroads have been known as Western Railroad or Western Railway:

- Western Railroad Company, builders of a Heavener, Oklahoma to Waldron, Arkansas line now operated by the Arkansas Southern Railroad
- Western Railroad (Texas) of New Braunfels
- Western Railroad of Alabama
- Western Railway of Alabama
- Western Railway of Arizona
- Western Railway of Florida
- Western Railroad (Massachusetts), 1833-1867, predecessor of the Boston and Albany Railroad
- Western Railroad of Minnesota
- Western Railroad (North Carolina), 1852-1879, predecessor of the Southern Railway
- Rutland Railway
- Western Railway Zone (India)
- West railway of Austria
- Western Railways and Light Company (a holding company for street railways in the U.S. Midwest)

== See also ==
- Western Railway (disambiguation)
