= Westline =

Theory of historic changes in maritime trade

The Westline is a fictional line describing the movement of the commercial centre of maritime trade over the past 5000 years.

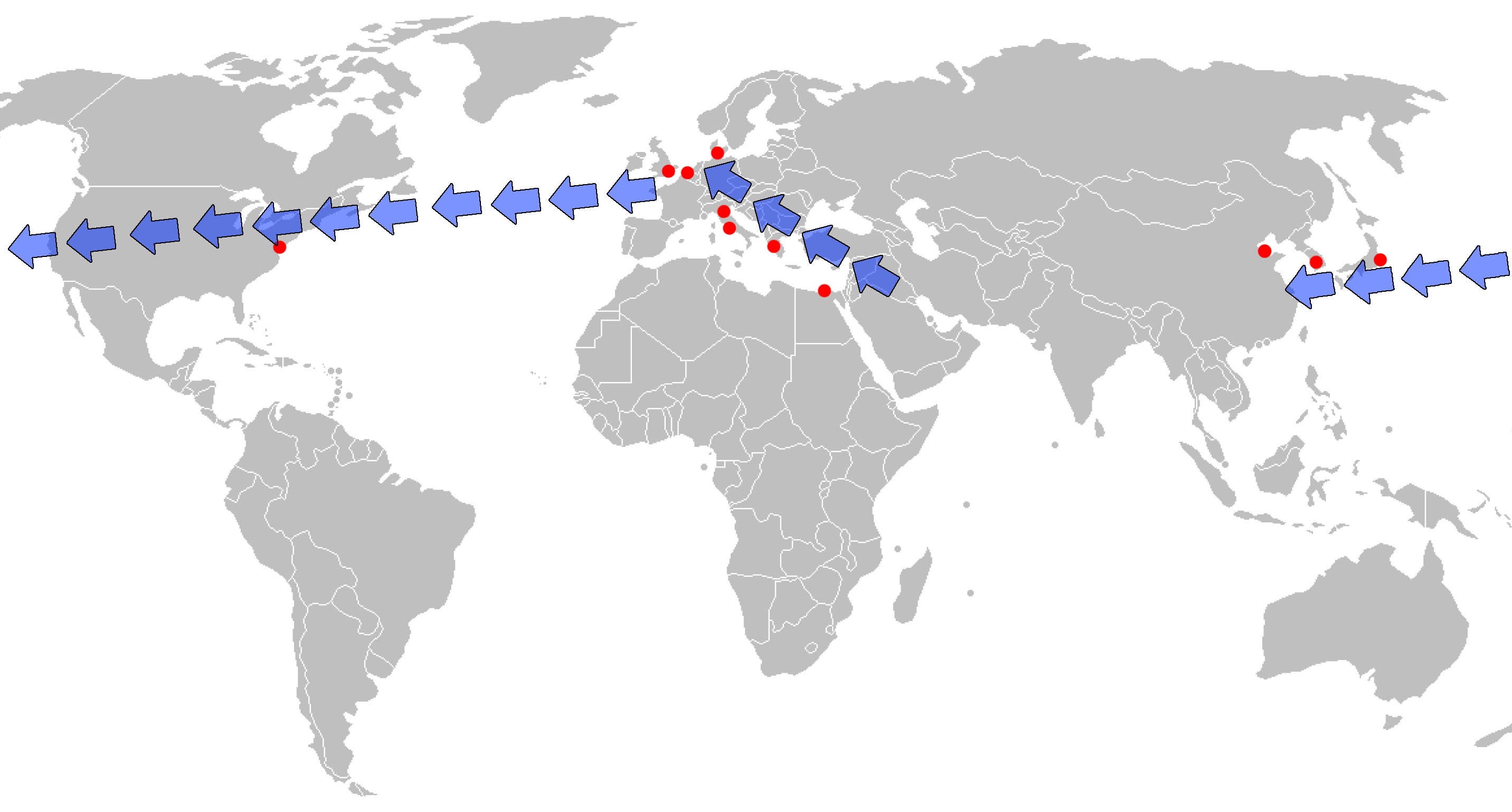
The Westline Theory. Red dots indicate maritime centers of trade.

The first recorded acts of trade by sea were found in Mesopotamia around 3000BC. From there, the center of maritime trade moved westwards, from Tyre in Lebanon to Rhodes, the Greek Peninsula around 300BC and later to Rome, which dominated the western Mediterranean around 100BC. Much later, around 1000AD, Venice and Genoa became the predominant sea trade centers, largely because of the opening up of new trade possibilities in the north- western European cities of Cologne, Bruges, Antwerp and Amsterdam. Around 1400AD the cities of the Hanseatic League connected trading nodes of the Baltic and Russia. These two currents met in Amsterdam in the seventeenth century, and about a century later in London.

The arrival of steam ships made regular Atlantic crossings possible, and instigated a shift of important maritime trade centers to North America, with its power gaining steadily in the period from 1880 onwards. In the 1950s, the rising economic powers of Japan, South Korea, China and India carried the Westline further on westwards.

== Bibliography ==
- Stopford, Martin (2009) "Maritime Economics", 5-6
