= William Burnham Woods =

US Supreme Court justice from 1881 to 1887

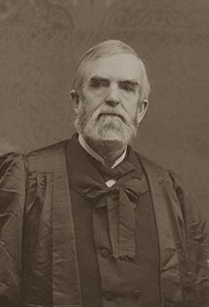
- Woods in 1886

Associate Justice of the Supreme Court of the United States
- In office January 5, 1881 – May 14, 1887
- Nominated by: Rutherford Hayes
- Preceded by: William Strong
- Succeeded by: Lucius Lamar

Judge of the United States Circuit Court for the Fifth Circuit
- In office December 22, 1869 – December 21, 1880
- Nominated by: Ulysses Grant
- Preceded by: Seat established
- Succeeded by: Don Pardee

Personal details
- Born: August 3, 1824 Newark, Ohio, U.S.
- Died: May 14, 1887 (aged 62) Washington, D.C., U.S.
- Party: Democratic (before 1863); Republican (1863–1887)
- Relatives: Charles R. Woods (brother)
- Education: Yale University (BA)

Military service
- Allegiance: United States; The Union
- Branch/service: United States Army; Union Army
- Years of service: 1862–1866
- Rank: Brigadier General; Brevet Major General
- Commands: 76th Ohio Infantry; XV Corps
- Battles/wars: American Civil War; Battle of Shiloh; Siege of Vicksburg; Atlanta campaign; Savannah Campaign; Carolinas campaign; Battle of Bentonville

William Burnham Woods (August 3, 1824 – May 14, 1887) was an American jurist who served as an associate justice of the Supreme Court of the United States. An appointee of President Rutherford B. Hayes, he served from 1881 until 1887. He wrote the majority opinion in United States v. Harris, involving the constitutionality of the Ku Klux Klan Act, and Presser v. Illinois, involving the application of the Second Amendment to the states; both cases adopted a narrow interpretation of the Fourteenth Amendment. He dissented rarely and wrote mostly uncontroversial opinions.

Born in Newark, Ohio, Woods received his degree from Yale University. He practiced law in Newark and entered politics, soon rising to be the speaker of the Ohio House of Representatives. A Democrat, he initially opposed the Lincoln administration's policies but supported the Union once the Civil War broke out. He joined the Union army as an officer, participating in a number of battles; after his discharge as a brevet major general in 1866, he settled in Alabama, where he practiced law and engaged in commercial activities. In 1868, he was elected to an Alabama state court on the Republican ticket.

In 1869, President Ulysses S. Grant appointed Woods a circuit judge for the Fifth Circuit, which covered six Southern states. In the Slaughter-House Cases and United States v. Cruikshank, he favored a broad interpretation of the Fourteenth Amendment that contrasted with the narrower one he supported on the Supreme Court. In another case, he upheld "separate but equal" schools. Hayes nominated Woods to the Supreme Court in 1880, and he was confirmed by the Senate 39–8. On the Court, he was a diligent worker who wrote more opinions than any other associate justice during his six-year tenure. He was struck ill in spring 1886 and died in 1887.

== Early life, education, and career ==
William Burnham Woods was born in Newark, Ohio, on August 3, 1824, to Ezekiel S. Woods, a Kentucky-born merchant and farmer, and Sarah Burnham Woods, who was from New England. He attended Western Reserve College (now Case Western Reserve University) before transferring to Yale University, from which he graduated as valedictorian in 1845. After returning to Newark, he studied law under the tutelage of S. D. King, a prominent lawyer; the two became partners after Woods was admitted to the bar in 1847. Woods took an interest in politics in the 1850s. While some evidence suggests that he was at first a Whig, he later became a member of the Democratic Party. In 1855, he married Anne E. Warner, with whom he had two children.

Woods became Newark's mayor in 1856, and the following year he was elected as a Democrat to the Ohio House of Representatives, immediately becoming its speaker. At first Woods staunchly opposed the policies of the Lincoln administration, but when the Civil War broke out, he supported the Union cause, vowing to stand by the federal government "in sunshine or storm, in peace or war, right or wrong". In February 1862, he joined the 76th Ohio Infantry Regiment as a lieutenant colonel, becoming colonel in September when the previous colonel – his brother, Charles R. Woods – was promoted to brigadier general.

Woods served in the Battle of Shiloh, the Siege of Vicksburg, and Sherman's March. He was made brigadier general in 1865 and participated in the Grand Review of the Armies in Washington. Just before his discharge in February 1866, he was brevetted a major general at the recommendation of Generals Sherman, Ulysses S. Grant, and John A. Logan. After being mustered out, Woods settled in Alabama, where he had been serving; there he practiced law, involved himself in cotton production, and invested in ironworks. He had by this time become a Republican, and in 1868 he was elected on the Republican ticket chancellor of the middle chancery division of Alabama.

== Circuit judge ==
When an 1869 judicial reorganization law created nine new circuit judgeships, President Grant appointed Woods to be circuit judge for the Fifth Circuit, which comprised Alabama, Florida, Georgia, Louisiana, Mississippi, and Texas. He was sworn in on December 22, 1869. Little information is available as to why the President selected Woods, but Thomas E. Baynes Jr. suggests that his Republican politics, his military service with Grant, and the fact that his brother-in-law Willard Warner was a U.S. Senator all played a role.

Woods and Justice Joseph P. Bradley (who was riding circuit) heard the Slaughter-House Cases in 1870; in an opinion by Bradley, they both agreed that the Fourteenth Amendment's Privileges or Immunities Clause should be interpreted broadly to protect civil rights associated with U.S. citizenship against infringement by the states. In another privileges-and-immunities decision, United States v. Hall (1871), Woods sustained an indictment under the Enforcement Act of 1870, holding that the Fourteenth Amendment gave Congress the power to protect the freedoms of speech and of assembly through legislation. The Supreme Court's 1873 ruling in the Slaughter-House Cases rejected Bradley and Woods's broader interpretation of the Fourteenth Amendment. In the 1874 Enforcement Act case of United States v. Cruikshank, Bradley dismissed federal charges against the perpetrators of the Colfax massacre, in which scores of African-American men were killed, but Woods dissented without an opinion; when the case reached the Supreme Court by certificate of division, it affirmed Bradley's decision.

In Bertonneau v. Board of Directors of City Schools, an 1878 school segregation decision, Woods offered an early formulation of what became the separate-but-equal doctrine. Rejecting the arguments of African-American children who sought admission to an whites-only public school in New Orleans, Woods emphasized that a blacks-only school was available and that the plaintiffs had not claimed it was inferior. He argued that while states were obliged to afford "equal privileges and advantages to both races", they could otherwise manage schools in whatever way they thought best. For Woods, the substance of the case was that "[w]hite children and colored children are compelled to attend different schools. That is all." In its notorious 1896 decision in Plessy v. Ferguson endorsing the separate-but-equal doctrine, the Supreme Court cited Bertonneau and other similar decisions that had upheld racial segregation in public schools.

Woods expended considerable effort to learn Louisiana law, which was especially complicated due to its French and Spanish roots. He prepared four volumes of reports of cases decided by the circuit court. In the aftermath of the contested 1876 presidential election, he avoided becoming involved in a dispute over the eligibility of a Florida Republican elector who had attempted to resign another federal office by writing to Woods. Woods moved to Atlanta, Georgia, in 1877.

== Supreme Court nomination ==
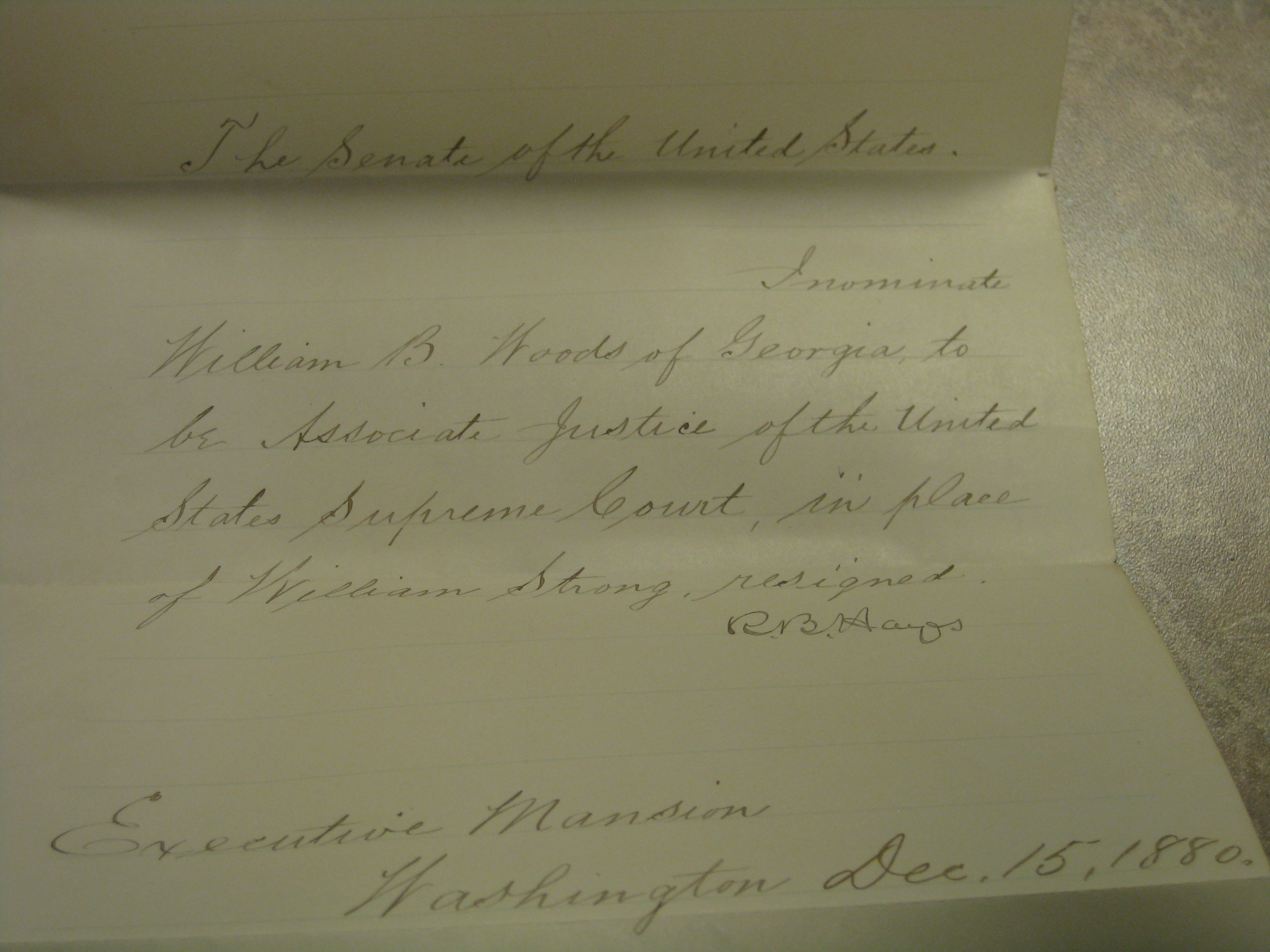
Woods's Supreme Court nomination

When a U.S. Supreme Court vacancy arose in 1877, many political figures urged President Rutherford B. Hayes to nominate Woods. These included Ohio notables (such as James A. Garfield and John Sherman), Southern Republicans, and local business interests, but Southern Democrats – for instance John A. Campbell, Lucius Q. C. Lamar, and John T. Morgan – advocated for him as well; Lamar, a former Confederate official, wrote that Woods "would be more acceptable to our people than any of those most likely to get the position". Hayes, however, nominated John Marshall Harlan instead.

In December 1880, the press reported that Justice William Strong intended to resign. Justice Bradley wanted to take his place as circuit justice for the Third Circuit, which would leave the Fifth Circuit position vacant—making it preferable for Strong's replacement to have experience with Louisiana and Texas law. Additionally, Woods was "precisely the kind of candidate Hayes sought to help bind bitter sectional wounds", according to the legal scholar Henry J. Abraham: he was born in the North yet lived in the South (without being thought of as a carpetbagger), and he was a Republican yet was trusted and supported by Southern Democrats. Strong submitted his letter of resignation on December 14, and the following day Hayes nominated Woods to take his place. Despite concerns that too many justices from Ohio were being appointed (Chase, Waite, Swayne, Woods, and the rumored next nominee Stanley Matthews were all associated with that state), the Senate confirmed him by a vote of 39 to 8 on December 21, 1880. He was sworn in on January 5, 1881.

== Supreme Court service ==
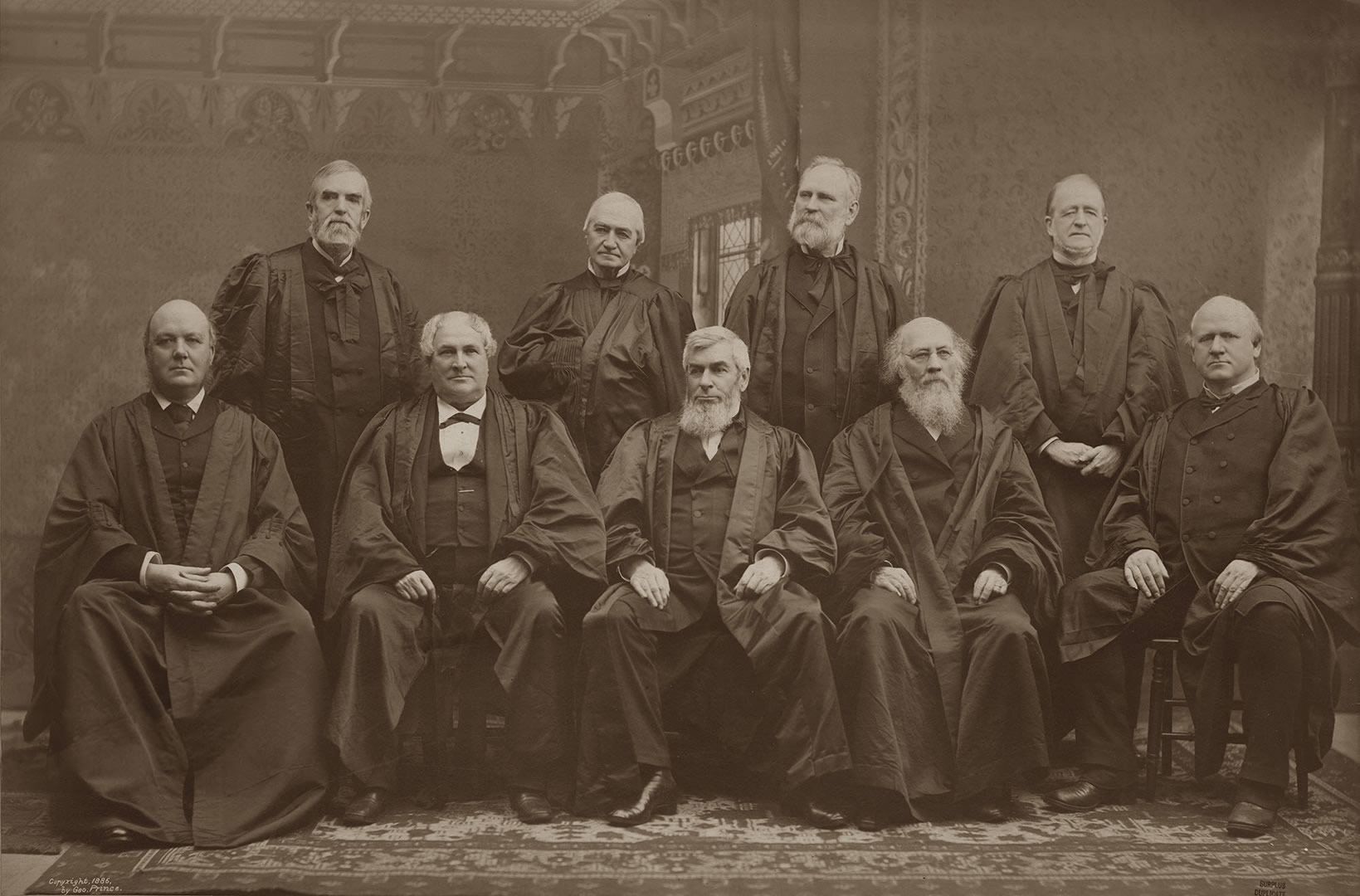
1886 group photograph of the Supreme Court justices. Woods is in the top row, leftmost.

Woods remained on the Supreme Court until his death in 1887. A hard worker on a Court deluged with cases, he wrote more opinions during his tenure than any other associate justice. Most of his opinions for the Court were in uncontroversial cases, often involving real property, patents, taxation, commerce, municipal law, trusts, or corporations. He participated in nearly 1,500 cases but dissented only eight times, and Baynes states that he "clearly should be characterized with the majority of the Court". His jurisprudence was generally nationalistic: he joined the majority in Juilliard v. Greenman to hold that the federal government could lawfully print paper money, and he dissented when the Court held in United States v. Lee that individuals could sue federal officers. In Elk v. Wilkins, he joined a dissent by Harlan when the majority held that Native Americans were not U.S. citizens.

Woods interpreted the Fourteenth Amendment more narrowly and conservatively on the Supreme Court than he had on the Fifth Circuit. He wrote for an eight-justice majority in United States v. Harris (1883) that the Fourteenth Amendment did not authorize laws that prohibit individuals from interfering with other individuals' civil rights. The decision, which involved defendants charged with breaking into a jail and beating four black prisoners (in one case to death), held that the Ku Klux Klan Act exceeded Congress's power. Harris set the stage for the Court's 8–1 decision later that year in the Civil Rights Cases, in which Woods joined the majority in holding much of the Civil Rights Act of 1875 unconstitutional. In Presser v. Illinois, involving a man convicted of violating Illinois law by carrying firearms as part of a private militia, Woods's opinion for a unanimous Court held that the Second Amendment applied only to the federal government; it "limited the possibilities of applying the Bill of Rights to the states through the Fourteenth Amendment", according to the legal scholar Robert J. Cottrol.

Woods became suddenly ill in the spring of 1886 and did not participate in the Court's 1886–87 term; the details of his illness are not known. His condition seemed to be improving during a lengthy stay in California, but it soon worsened. Woods died aged 62 on May 14, 1887, in Washington, D.C., and he was buried at the Cedar Hill Cemetery in Newark, Ohio. President Grover Cleveland nominated Lucius Quintus Cincinnatus Lamar to replace him.

== Legacy ==
The scholar Louis Filler began a 1969 essay on Woods by describing him as "one of the least known of all the Justices who have served on the United States Supreme Court". A 1970 survey of law professors rated him "below average", but the legal scholar D. Grier Stephenson suggests that this rating "probably results more from general unfamiliarity than from a careful appraisal of his work". The historian Stephen Cresswell attributes Woods's low historical reputation to his brief tenure, the frequency of his votes with the majority, and perceptions that he was a carpetbagger with a "muddled judicial philosophy". According to Timothy L. Hall, "[m]ore a follower than a leader, more an echo of the reverberating ideas of others than an original thinker in his own right, his brief years on the Court climaxed a life too far removed from the center of events to warrant more than passing historical mention".

== See also ==
- List of American Civil War generals (Union)
- List of justices of the Supreme Court of the United States

Legal offices
New seat	Judge of the United States Circuit Courts for the Fifth Circuit; 1869–1880	Succeeded by Don Pardee
Preceded by William Strong	Associate Justice of the Supreme Court of the United States; 1881–1887	Succeeded by Lucius Lamar
