= Joseph P. Bradley =

US Supreme Court justice from 1870 to 1892

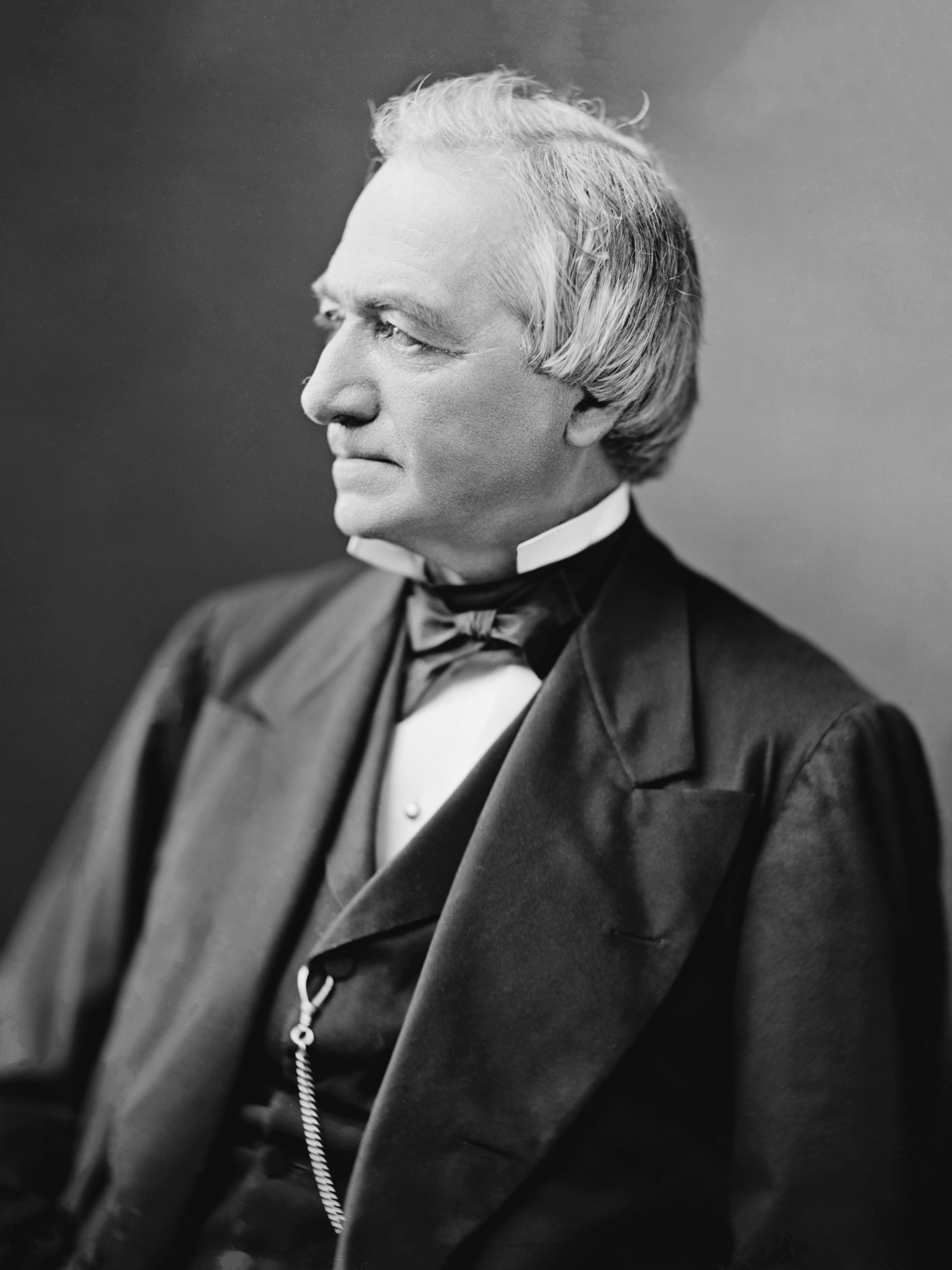
- Bradley c. 1870s

Associate Justice of the Supreme Court of the United States
- In office March 23, 1870 – January 22, 1892
- Nominated by: Ulysses S. Grant
- Preceded by: Seat established
- Succeeded by: George Shiras

Personal details
- Born: Joseph Philo Bradley; March 14, 1813 Berne, New York, U.S.
- Died: January 22, 1892 (aged 78) Washington, D.C., U.S.
- Resting place: Mount Pleasant Cemetery
- Party: Republican
- Spouse: Mary Hornblower
- Education: Rutgers University, New Brunswick (BA)

Joseph Philo Bradley (March 14, 1813 – January 22, 1892) was an American jurist who served as an associate justice of the Supreme Court of the United States from 1870 to 1892. He was also a member of the Electoral Commission that decided the disputed 1876 United States presidential election.

== Early life ==
The son of Philo Bradley and Mercy Gardner Bradley, Bradley was born to humble beginnings in Berne, New York. He was the oldest of 12 children. He attended local schools and began teaching at the age of 16. In 1833, the Dutch Reformed Church of Berne advanced Joseph Bradley $250 to study for the ministry at Rutgers University. He graduated in 1836. After graduation, he was made Principal of the Millstone Academy, and decided to study law.

He was persuaded by his Rutgers classmate Frederick Theodore Frelinghuysen to join him in Newark and pursue legal studies at the Office of the Collector of the Port of Newark. He was admitted to the bar in 1839.

Bradley began in private practice in New Jersey, specializing in patent and railroad law, and he became very prominent in these fields and quite wealthy. Bradley remained dedicated to self-study throughout his life and collected an extensive library. He married Mary Hornblower in Newark in 1844. In 1851, Bradley, once employed as an actuary for the Mutual Benefit Life Insurance Company, submitted an article to the Journal of the Institute of Actuaries detailing an historical account of a Severan dynasty-era Roman life table compiled by the Roman jurist Ulpian in approximately 220 AD during the reign of Elagabalus (218–222) that was included in the Digesta seu Pandectae (533) codification ordered by Justinian I (527–565) of the Eastern Roman Empire.

== Supreme Court ==
=== Appointment ===
On February 7, 1870, President Ulysses S. Grant nominated Bradley as an associate justice of the Supreme Court of the United States, to the seat created by the Judiciary Act of 1869. Several weeks later, on March 21, he was confirmed by the U.S. Senate by a 46–9 vote. Bradley took the judicial oath of office on March 23, 1870, and remained on the Court until January 22, 1892. Bradley was the president's second nominee for the position. The first, Ebenezer R. Hoar was rejected by the Senate.

=== Court jurisprudence ===
Bradley took a broad view of the national government's powers under the Commerce Clause but interpreted the Fourteenth Amendment somewhat narrowly, as did much of the rest of the court at the time. He authored the majority opinion in the Civil Rights Cases of 1883 but was among the four dissenters in the Slaughter-House Cases in 1873. His interpretation of the Fourteenth Amendment in both cases remained the basis for subsequent rulings through the modern era.

Bradley concurred with the court's decision in Bradwell v. Illinois, which held that the right to practice law was not constitutionally protected under the Privileges or Immunities Clause of the Fourteenth Amendment. Bradley disagreed with the majority opinion, apparently because it rested on the decision in the Slaughter-House Cases, but concurred in the judgment on grounds that the clause did not protect women in their choice of vocation. The concurrence is noted for Bradley's description of womanhood: "The harmony, not to say identity, of interest and views which belong, or should belong, to the family institution is repugnant to the idea of a woman adopting a distinct and independent career from that of her husband (...) The paramount destiny and mission of women are to fulfill the noble and benign offices of wife and mother. This is the law of the Creator."

It was due to Bradley's intervention that prisoners charged in the Colfax Massacre of 1873 were freed, after he happened to attend their trial and ruled that the federal law they were charged under was unconstitutional. This resulted in the federal government's bringing the case on appeal to the Supreme Court as United States v. Cruikshank (1875). The court's ruling on this case meant that the federal government would not intervene on paramilitary and group attacks on individuals. It essentially opened the door to heightened paramilitary activity in the South that forced Republicans from office, suppressed black voting, and opened the way for white Democratic takeover of state legislatures, and resulting Jim Crow laws and passage of disfranchising constitutions.

Bradley dissented in Chicago, Milwaukee & St. Paul Railway Co. v. Minnesota, which, though not racially motivated, was another due process case arising from the Fourteenth Amendment. In his dissent, Bradley argued that the majority had in siding with the railroad created a situation where the reasonableness of an act of a state legislature was a judicial question, subjugating the legislature to the will of the judiciary. Bradley's opinion in this case is echoed in modern arguments regarding judicial activism.

Bradley also wrote the opinion in Hans v. Louisiana, holding that a state could not be sued in a federal court by one of its own citizens. This is perhaps ironic in light of his dissent in the railroad case, since the Hans doctrine is entirely based on judicial activism and, as Bradley admitted in his opinion, not supported by the text of the Constitution.

As an individual Supreme Court Justice, Bradley decided In re Guiteau, a petition for habeas corpus filed on behalf of Charles Guiteau, the assassin of President James A. Garfield. Guiteau's lawyers argued that he had been improperly tried in the District of Columbia because, although Guiteau shot Garfield in Washington, D.C., Garfield died at his home in New Jersey. Bradley denied the petition in a lengthy opinion and Guiteau was executed.

== 1877 Electoral Commission ==
Bradley was the 15th and final member of the Electoral Commission that decided the disputed 1876 presidential election between Republican Rutherford B. Hayes and Democrat Samuel J. Tilden.

The U.S. House and Senate named five members each to serve on the commission, and the Supreme Court named five associate justices to serve. The key vote would fall to one of the named justices, David Davis, an independent. However, when Davis was elected to the Senate, he excused himself from the Commission and resigned from the Supreme Court to take his seat in the Senate. Bradley, a long time Republican, replaced him on the commission, shifting its political balance.

Bradley wrote a number of opinions while on the electoral commission, and like the other members sided with his own party. The final 8-7 vote, which split along partisan lines, effectively made Hayes president, and Bradley was characterized in the press as the "casting vote", or tiebreaker. Democrats, who had hoped that Bradley might side with their candidate, focused their anger on him rather than on his fellow Republicans on the panel. Press reports that criticized the decision singled out Bradley for vilification, and he received a number of death threats.

There have been detailed but unproven claims over the years that Bradley originally planned to come down on the side of Tilden, but was lobbied into changing his mind on the night before the final decision. These claims have been discussed at length in various studies of the electoral dispute. Bradley always denied that he had been improperly influenced by anyone.

== Death ==
Bradley died in Washington, D.C., on January 22, 1892, and was interred at Mount Pleasant Cemetery in Newark, New Jersey.

Bradley's personal, legal, and court papers are archived at the New Jersey Historical Society in Newark and open for research.

== Historical reappraisal ==
In 2021, Rutgers University, Bradley's alma mater, deleted his name from a building the university acquired in 1971; a University committee "recommended Bradley's name be removed after a study of his judicial record. The study showed Bradley chose to use his position as a Supreme Court Justice to undo reconstruction, regressing on civil rights and opening a new era of oppression".

== See also ==
- List of justices of the Supreme Court of the United States

Legal offices
New seat	Associate Justice of the Supreme Court of the United States; 1870–1892	Succeeded by George Shiras
