= United States v. Kagama =

- Supreme Court of the United States

Submitted May 10, 1886 Argued March 2, 1886
- Full case name: United States v. Kagama, alias Pactah Billy, an Indian, and another.
- Citations: 118 U.S. 375 (more) 6 S. Ct. 1109; 30 L. Ed. 228; 1886 U.S. LEXIS 1939

Holding
- The Major Crimes Act was constitutional, and, therefore, the case was within the jurisdiction of the federal courts. This ruling meant that the San Francisco Court's indictment would stand.

Court membership
- Chief Justice Morrison Waite Associate Justices Samuel F. Miller · Stephen J. Field; Joseph P. Bradley · John M. Harlan; William B. Woods · Stanley Matthews; Horace Gray · Samuel Blatchford

Case opinion
- Majority: Miller, joined by unanimous

Laws applied
- U.S. Const. Art. I, § 8, cl. 3; 18 U.S.C. § 1153

United States v. Kagama, 118 U.S. 375 (1886), was a landmark United States Supreme Court case that upheld the constitutionality of the Major Crimes Act of 1885. This Congressional act gave the federal courts jurisdiction in certain Indian-on-Indian crimes, even if they were committed on an Indian reservation. Kagama, a Yurok Native American (Indian) accused of murder, was selected as a test case by the Department of Justice to test the constitutionality of the Act.

The importance of the ruling in this particular case was that it tested the constitutionality of the Act and confirmed Congress's authority over Indian affairs. Plenary power over Indian tribes, supposedly granted to the U.S. Congress by the Commerce Clause of the Constitution, was deemed not necessary to support the Supreme Court's decision. Instead, the Court found that the power derived from the tribes' status as dependent domestic nations. This recognition allowed Congress to pass the Dawes Act the following year. The case has been criticized by legal scholars as drawing on powers that are not granted to Congress by the Constitution, but it remains good law.

== Background ==
=== Crow Dog and the Major Crimes Act of 1885 ===
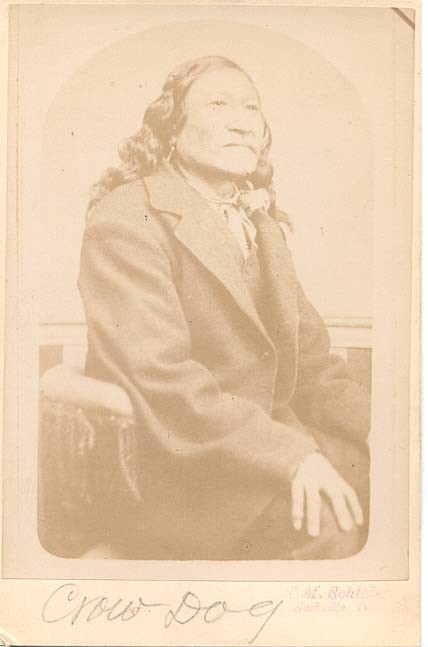
Crow Dog

In 1881, a Brulé Lakota Sioux named Crow Dog killed his government-installed chief. Crow Dog was detained and tried for murder. However, he contended that the United States held no jurisdiction on the reservation. The Supreme Court agreed, confirming Crow Dog's assertion that they lacked jurisdiction because the crime occurred in Indian country between two Indians. In the opinion issued by Justice Stanley Matthews for the Supreme Court in Ex parte Crow Dog in 1883, the Court implied that if Congress intended to exert legislative authority over these tribes they must pass an explicit law granting jurisdiction to the federal courts over Indian-on-Indian crime in Indian country, and then the Court would confirm its constitutionality.

In response, Congress debated the need and importance of teaching Indians regard for the rule of law. Further, it was argued that if an Indian committed a crime he could be tried under the laws of the United States. Congress ultimately passed an addendum to the Indian Appropriations Act of March 3, 1885, more commonly known as the Major Crimes Act, claiming exclusive jurisdiction of the federal government to prosecute Indians for seven major crimes anywhere in the nation, if the land is in Indian country, including Indian reservations. (Note: The Act exempted several tribes, including the Five Civilized Tribes from its provisions. Indian country included areas that were nominally under state jurisdiction but for the legislation by Congress, incorporating reservations established by executive order for instance.) The seven original crimes included in the 1885 act (the list is now 15 crimes) were murder, manslaughter, rape, assault with intent to kill, arson, burglary, and larceny.

=== Hoopa Valley Reservation ===
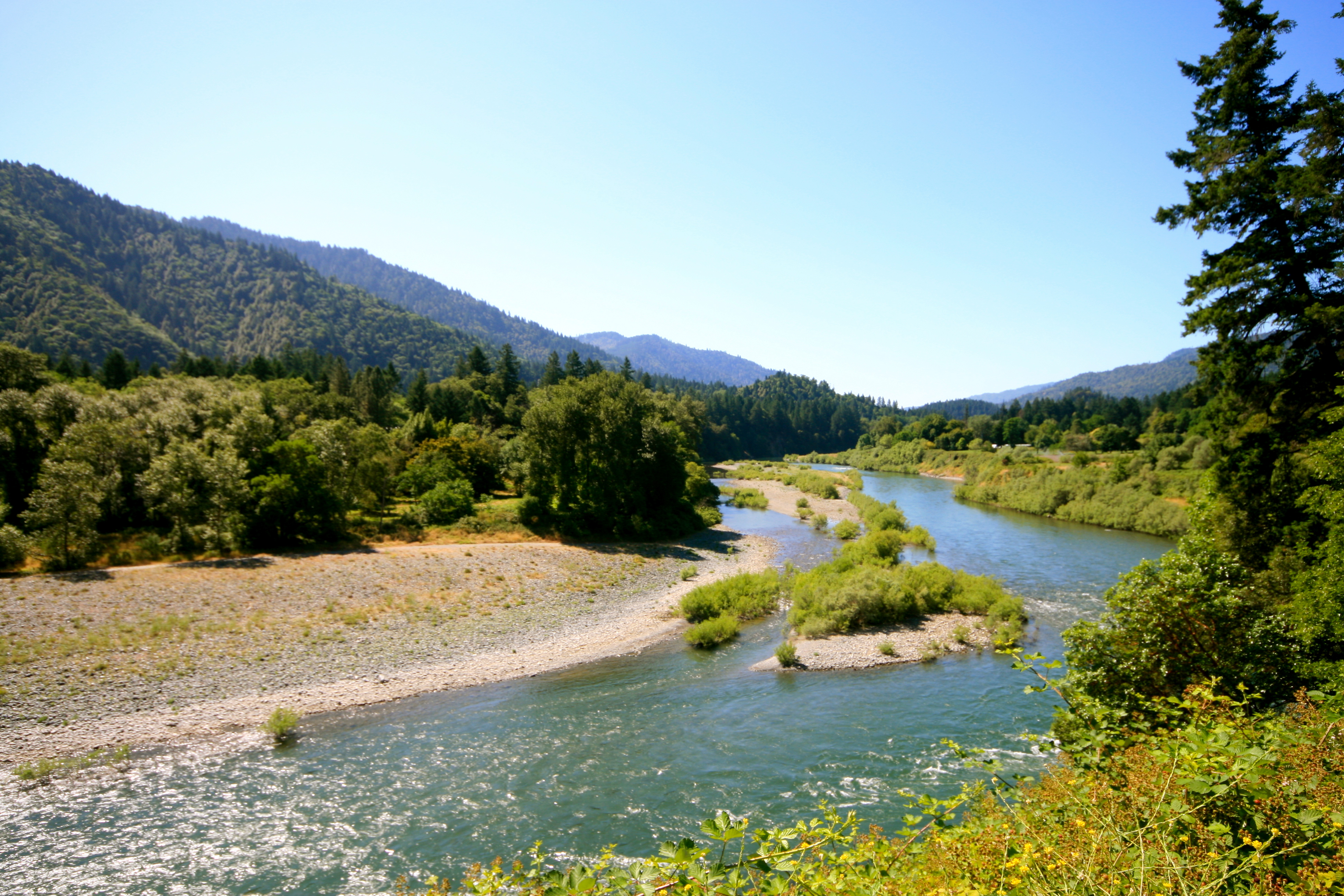
Trinity River near reservation

The Hoopa Valley Reservation was created by executive order in 1864. At the time the reservation was formed, three unique bands of Indian tribes lived on different parts of the Klamath River, each with its own language. The Yurok lived on the Lower Klamath, the Karuk occupied the Upper Klamath and the Hupa lived at the confluence of the Trinity and Klamath Rivers in Humboldt County, California. The reservation was supposed to be a home for other tribes within the region.

The tribes living along the river had long-established rules for property rights and ownership, including how property was to be passed down from one generation to the next. In some cases, families owned lands that were located a substantial distance from their "home" village.

In charge of the reservation was the Indian agent, Major Charles Porter, who by commanding the local military garrison (Fort Gaston) on the reservation was charged with the de facto responsibility for the people on the reservation. Without legal authority and against government policy, Porter allotted small parcels of land to the local Indian people, thus upsetting an age-old property rights system among families in the Klamath River Valley. (Note: Tribal members had property rights to their home, their gardens and orchards, and their fishing sites. Disputes were handled by tribal leaders who would listen to both sides and then present a recommendation which was normally followed.) On several occasions, Agent Porter had been called out to Kagama (Note: Kagama was also known as Billy Pactaw.) and Iyouse's (Note: Iyouse was also known as Jefferson Dowd.) homes to mediate their property dispute. Shortly before the murder, Kagama requested title to the land upon which he built his home.

=== The crime and the path to the Supreme Court ===
On June 24, 1885, three months after the Major Crimes Act was passed, Kagama and his son Mahawaha went to Iyouse's house, where an argument ensued that resulted in the death by stabbing of Iyouse. Mahawaha reportedly held Iyouse's wife while Kagama stabbed Iyouse. Agent Porter moved quickly to detain both Kagama and Mahawaha on murder charges. He informed both federal and state authorities. The local district attorney declined to prosecute, citing a policy of not prosecuting crimes between Indians. The U.S. Attorney for Northern California forcefully prosecuted the case. On October 18, 1885, both Kagama and Mahawaha were taken to San Francisco for trial, after having been indicted (Note: The indictment charged them with "not having the fear of God before their eyes, but being moved and seduced by the institution of the devil ... had feloniously, willfully, and with malice aforethought did make an assault ... with a certain knife made of iron and steel.") for murder. The indictment charged that the crime occurred on the reservation, even though it was later determined at the trial to have occurred outside the reservation boundaries to the north.

Because the crime supposedly occurred on the Hoopa Valley Reservation, the U.S. Attorney and the Bureau of Indian Affairs (BIA) fully supported the jurisdictional shift to the federal government and were immediately prepared to prosecute the case in federal courts. Challenges to the subject matter jurisdiction were heard before the circuit court in early October 1885. Circuit Judge Lorenzo Sawyer and District Court Judge George Sabin heard the challenge but disagreed on the law. The case received a "certificate of division" resulting in the case being forwarded to the Supreme Court later in October. (Note: The federal court system initially only had two ways to review a federal criminal case, a motion for a new trial and a certificate of division. In the certificate of division process, the district judge and the single circuit court judge for that district met and decided the question. When they were unable to decide, they certified the question to the Supreme Court.)

Since this case challenged the authority of the federal courts to try Indian-on-Indian crime, this case was heard as an interlocutory appeal, meaning that the Supreme Court would have to decide the constitutionality of the claimed jurisdiction before Kagama could be tried for the killing of Iyouse in federal court.

== Supreme Court ==
=== Arguments ===
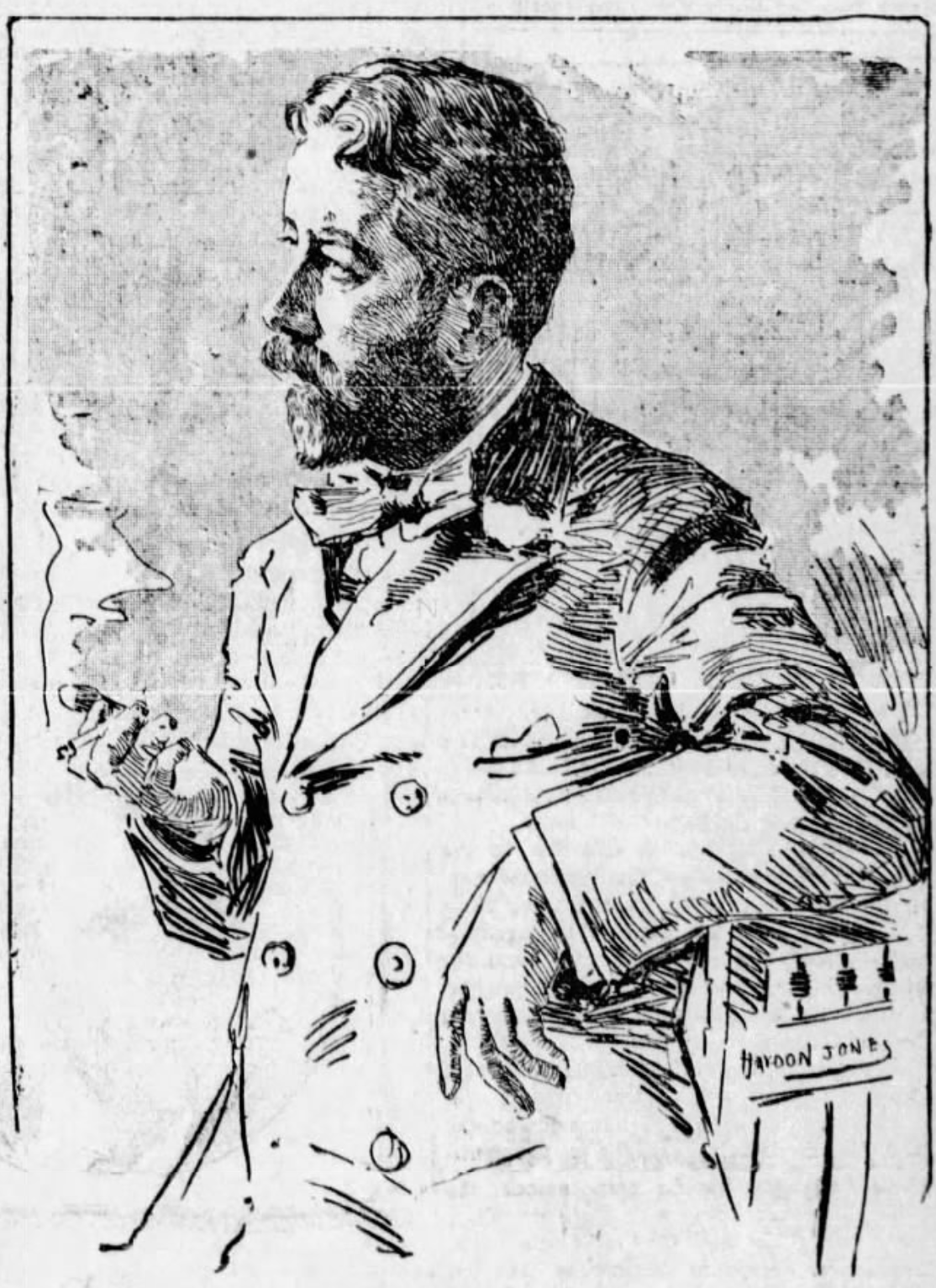
1895 sketch of lawyer Joseph D. Redding published in The San Francisco Examiner.

Kagama was represented by 27-year-old Joseph D. Redding. (Note: Redding had been appointed to represent Kagama by Judge Sawyer.) The United States was represented by George A. Jenks, who was an Assistant United States Secretary of the Interior. Arguments were heard before the Supreme Court on May 2, 1886, only five months after the circuit court delivered a split opinion on the matter of jurisdiction. (Note: In 1886, cases were taking three years to reach the Supreme Court.)

Jenks urged the court to look to its earlier ruling in Crow Dog, where the Court commented in dicta that Congress possessed the authority to regulate all commerce with Indian tribes, because of the Indian Commerce Clause of the Constitution. In his listing of precedents, he cited numerous laws passed by Congress regulating Indian commerce; he did not cite any other case law that supported Congress' authority over internal Indian matters, because there was none. Further, Jenks incorporated aspects of the political debate in Congress when the act was passed citing that the U.S. should be able to enforce its laws within its borders, regardless of treaty rights. The prosecution argued that Congress had the absolute authority to regulate Indians and their affairs.

Joseph Redding defended his clients vigorously. His argument was three-fold. First he argued that in one hundred years of Indian policy, Congress had never prosecuted Indian-on-Indian crime. Further, the indictment as stated contained no element of commerce and was therefore outside the purview of Congress to legislate such a law. Finally, he argued that such a profound shift in Indian policy should not be enacted in a law whose heading and body were wholly inconsistent with the intent of the Major Crimes Act. In effect, he argued that such a law governing a people should be debated in full sight of the American public and on its own merits. Redding argued that Congress could not assert power over sovereign people who, when making treaties to cede land, reserved certain rights to themselves. He did not raise the issue that the tribes already did have a system of law that dealt with crimes against another person.

=== Opinion of the Court ===
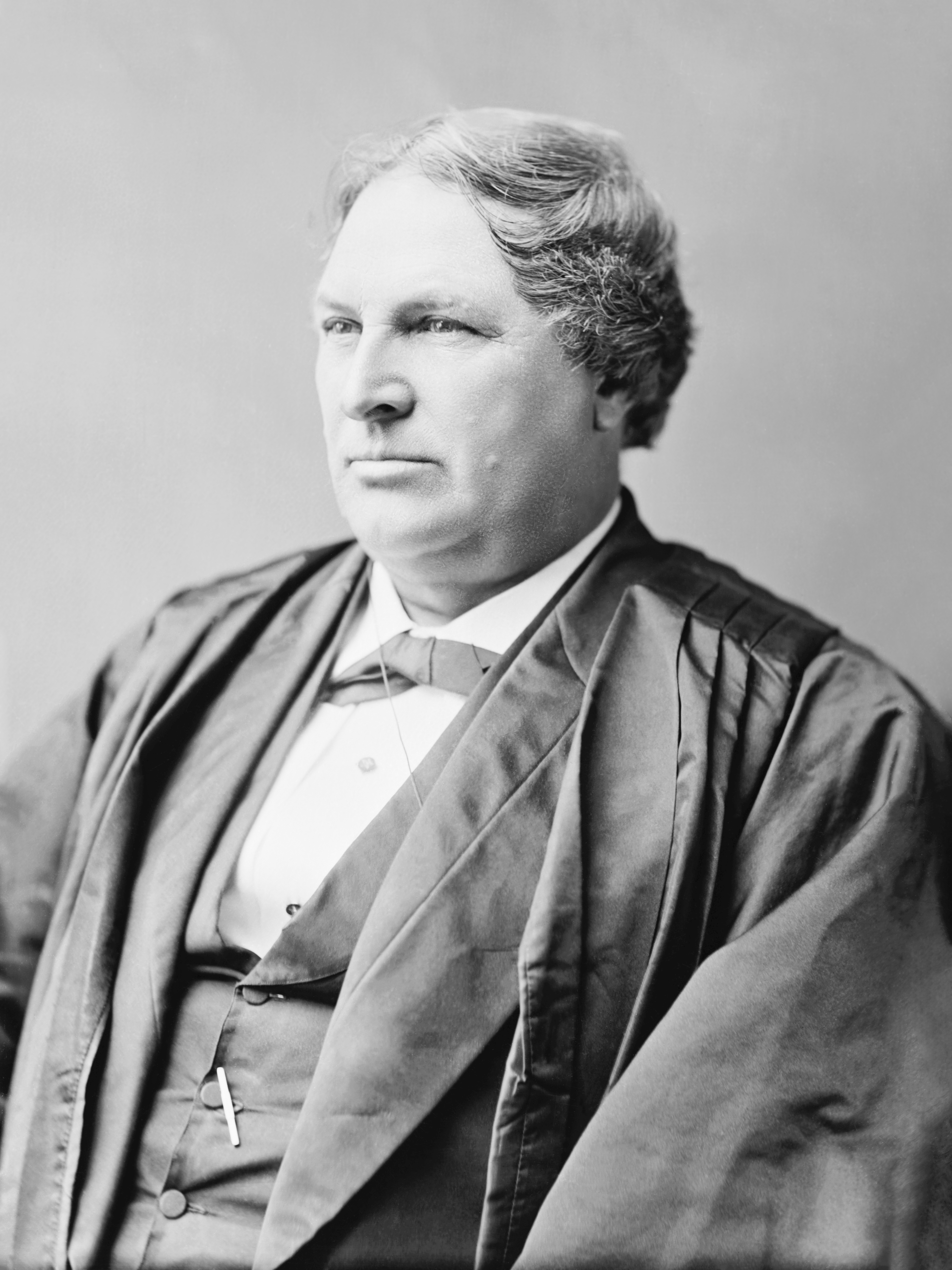
Justice Miller, author of the opinion

In a unanimous decision issued at the end of May 1886, and authored by Justice Samuel Freeman Miller, the Supreme Court ruled that the Major Crimes Act was constitutional, and, therefore, the case was within the jurisdiction of the federal courts. Miller dismissed the argument that the Act was proper under the Indian Commerce Clause, noting that the case did not present a commerce issue. (Note: Miller said that it would be "a very strained construction of this clause that a system of criminal laws for Indians ... was authorized by the grant of power to regulate commerce with the Indian tribes.") He held instead that it was necessary since Indians were wards of the United States. Justice Miller was known for writing opinions that supported federal power over state's rights. This ruling meant that the federal circuit court's indictment would stand and the case would proceed to trial back in Northern California. (Note: At the time, there were no United States circuit courts of appeals. Instead, there were district courts and circuit courts. The circuit courts were a mix of appellate and original jurisdiction courts.)

The opinion drew heavily on the language of the Solicitor General's brief, which by today's standards would be considered by many as racially charged. The language in Miller's opinion is infamous for its description of Indian tribes as weak, degraded and dependent on the federal government for support. He adopts language from Cherokee Nation v. Georgia describing each tribe as a "ward" and in a state of "pupilage".

Miller, having dismissed the Indian Commerce Clause as a source of authority, did not cite another constitutional source of the power. In effect, this decision contended that the U.S. government had supreme authority to enforce laws within its borders, but did not mention where this power was outlined in the Constitution. From the time the crime occurred to the Supreme Court decision, eleven months had passed. (Note: In 1886, cases would normally take three years to reach the Supreme Court and have an opinion issued.)

== Subsequent developments ==
=== Trial of Kagama ===
The trial was held in San Francisco in September 1886. The prosecution called four witnesses, including Iyouse's wife and a witness to the murder named "Charlie". The defense called one witness, John B. Treadwell. Treadwell testified that the murder was outside the boundaries of the reservation. Based on Treadwell's position within the United States General Land Office, the judge believed him and ordered a directed verdict of not guilty. (Note: Although it is undisputed that Kagama killed Iyouse, the Major Crimes Act only allowed the federal government to prosecute crimes on reservation land. Since the murder did not happen within that jurisdiction, a not guilty verdict was required. California declined to prosecute, although they could have done so.)

Humboldt County Sheriff T. M. Brown stated that he would not arrest Kagama for a crime against another Indian. Brown stated that in his 26 years of law enforcement in the area, the state had never prosecuted an Indian for Indian-on-Indian crime. Brown also said that Kagama was trustworthy and industrious, while the victim was a "treacherous" blackmailer who had already killed several men. The sheriff believed that Kagama did not have any option but to kill the victim.

=== Consequences and criticism of the decision ===
Kagama was the case that articulated Congress' plenary power over the Native American tribes in the late 19th century. It reaffirmed Congress' power to pass legislation, including the Dawes Act, that would take away many of the liberties that Native Americans had been able to hold on to up until that point. 19th and early 20th century U.S. lawmakers viewed the American Indians as inferior people who would benefit from being assimilated into the Euro-American culture. The laws that followed the Kagama ruling were attempts to destroy the Native American cultural differences and force these tribes to share the Euro-American culture viewed by these lawmakers to be the superior culture.

The decision has been widely criticized by legal scholars. David E. Wilkins noted that if the Indian Commerce Clause or Taxation Clause did not contain the authority, and the tribes had not granted it by treaty or consent, then the Major Crimes Act would be unconstitutional and the Court should have declared it void. Phillip P. Frickey describes the Kagama decision as "a whirlwind of circular reasoning", with the Court justifying congressional power due to the tribe's weakness, which it also noted was due to the tribes dealing with the U.S. government. Frickey felt the decision was an embarrassment to constitutional theory, to logic, and to humanity. (Note: Stating "Its apparent inconsistency with the most fundamental of constitutional principles—the McCulloch understanding that Congress ordinarily possesses only that authority delegated to it in the Constitution—is an embarrassment of constitutional theory. Its slipshod method of bootstrapping a congressional plenary power over Indian affairs is an embarrassment of logic. Its holding, which intimates that congressional power over Indian affairs is limitless, is an embarrassment of humanity.") Robert N. Clinton stated that "[t]his remarkable decision obviously invoked rhetoric of colonial expansion, rather than the rhetoric of American constitutional discourse." Daniel L. Rotenberg said that Kagama was "one more item on the long litany of injustices to the American Indian." In addition to the law professors, (Note: Dr. Wilkins was at the University of Minnesota Law School, Frickey was at the California-Berkeley School of Law, Justice Clinton is at the Arizona State University Law School, and Rotenberg was at the University of Houston Law School.) various other authors in law reviews have also been critical of the decision. Warren Stapleton, in the Arizona State University law journal, has stated that the decision was incorrect and that the Major Crimes Act is in fact unconstitutional. In a Comment, the University of Pennsylvania Law Review noted that "the Court promulgated what can be called the 'it-must-be-somewhere' doctrine ..."

Kagama remains good law, being cited in support of the plenary power doctrine as recently as 2004 in United States v. Lara by the Supreme Court, and cited in 2015 by the 6th Circuit. Although one legal scholar, Matthew L.M. Fletcher, states that the apex of the doctrine was reached in 1955, in Tee-Hit-Ton Indians v. United States, he also acknowledges that the doctrine is still current law. In 2010, Pawnee lawyer Walter Echo-Hawk wrote in his book, In the Courts of the Conqueror, that Kagama has been used:

[T]o justify excessive government intrusion into the internal affairs of Indian tribes and to exercise unwarranted control over the lives and property of American Indians in a slide towards despotism ... [T]he creation of frightening, state-run, Orwellian societies on Indian reservations was perfectly legal in the courts of the conqueror, because it was done in the name of guardianship.

== See also ==
- List of United States Supreme Court cases, volume 118
- List of U.S. Supreme Court Cases involving Indian Tribes
- Outline of United States federal Indian law and policy
