= Federal Power Commission v. Hope Natural Gas Co. =

- Supreme Court of the United States

Argued October 20 – October 21, 1943 Decided January 3, 1944
- Full case name: Federal Power Commission et al. v. Hope Natural Gas Company
- Citations: 320 U.S. 591 (more) 64 S. Ct. 281; 88 L. Ed. 333

Case history
- Prior: Rate order of the Federal Power Commission reducing Hope Natural Gas Company's rates; order set aside by the United States Court of Appeals.
- Subsequent: None

Holding
- Under the Natural Gas Act, the validity of a rate order depends on its overall effect rather than the particular formula used to calculate the rate base. Rates are constitutional if they permit the utility to operate successfully, maintain financial integrity, attract capital, and compensate investors for the risks assumed.

Court membership
- Chief Justice Harlan F. Stone Associate Justices Owen Roberts · Hugo Black; Stanley F. Reed · Felix Frankfurter; William O. Douglas · Frank Murphy; Robert H. Jackson · Wiley B. Rutledge

Case opinions
- Majority: Douglas, joined by Stone, Reed, Frankfurter, Murphy
- Dissent: Roberts, joined by Jackson, Rutledge

Laws applied
- Natural Gas Act of 1938; U.S. Const. amend. V
- This case overturned a previous ruling or rulings
- Smyth v. Ames

Federal Power Commission v. Hope Natural Gas Co. was a United States Supreme Court case in which the court held that the validity of a rate order issued under the Natural Gas Act depends on its overall effect rather than the particular formula used to calculate the rate base. Rates are constitutional if they permit the utility to operate successfully, maintain financial integrity, attract capital, and compensate investors for the risks assumed.

The decision was a linchpin of public utitlity regulation for decades. After Hope Natural Gas courts largely deferred to commission ratemaking decisions.

== Background ==
Hope Natural Gas Company was a wholly owned subsidiary of Standard Oil of New Jersey engaged in producing, transporting, and selling natural gas. The FPC investigated Hope Natural Gas after receiving complaints from Ohio municipalities that the rates were too high.

The main issue in the case was whether a rate adjustment made by the Federal Power Commission (FPC) was valid under the Natural Gas Act of 1938. The company showed evidence disputing the FPC's cost determination, however the FPC did not find the evidence credible and ordered Hope Natural Gas, which mainly sold gas to companies in Ohio and Pennsylvania, to lower its rates based on the costs of providing gas.

The Fourth Circuit Court of Appeals disagreed with how the FPC calculated the rates. They said the FPC should consider the current market value instead of only the incurred costs. They also disputed the accuracy of the cost calculation.

== Legal background ==
Early 20th-century Supreme Court decisions had upheld regulations that reduced the value of private property under the police power without requiring just compensation for the loss. In Nebbia v. New York (1934), the Supreme Court rejected the view that prices were "peculiarly sacrosanct" and treated price regulation as an exercise of the police power. The Court nevertheless continued to assume that rate regulation was subject to a constitutional requirement of a reasonable return. In West v. Chesapeake & Potomac Telephone Co. (1935), Justice Owen Roberts, writing for the Court, stated that when legislation prescribing rates or charges takes the use of property, the Due Process Clause requires "a reasonable rate of return upon that value."

By the late 1920s, the Supreme Court had accepted both original cost and reproduction cost as possible bases for determining a utility's rate base, while favoring reproduction cost in its decisions. Regulatory authorities generally preferred the original-cost or prudent-investment approach because it was simpler to administer. The reproduction-cost or “fair value” approach subsequently came under increasing criticism and was gradually narrowed.

When the Federal Water Power Act of 1920 created the Federal Power Commission as an independent agency for the purpose of regulating hydroelectric power, the Act also provided a basis for using net investment rather than fair value as the rate base for licensees. After Congress expanded its rate-making authority to include interstate wholesale sales of electricity and natural gas, the FPC generally used an investment rate base in its proceedings. In 1940, the FPC issued an interim order requiring Natural Gas Pipeline Company of America to reduce its rates by $3.75 million annually. The Commission based its order on reproduction-cost evidence and used a fair value rate base, while disallowing an $8.5 million claim for going-concern value. In subsequent proceedings, the Commission sought to use an investment rate base, and the Supreme Court unanimously sustained the rate reduction. The Court stated that the Constitution did not require rate-making bodies to use any particular formula or combination of formulas and that regulatory agencies could make "pragmatic adjustments" according to the circumstances of each case.

== Supreme Court ==
=== Decision ===
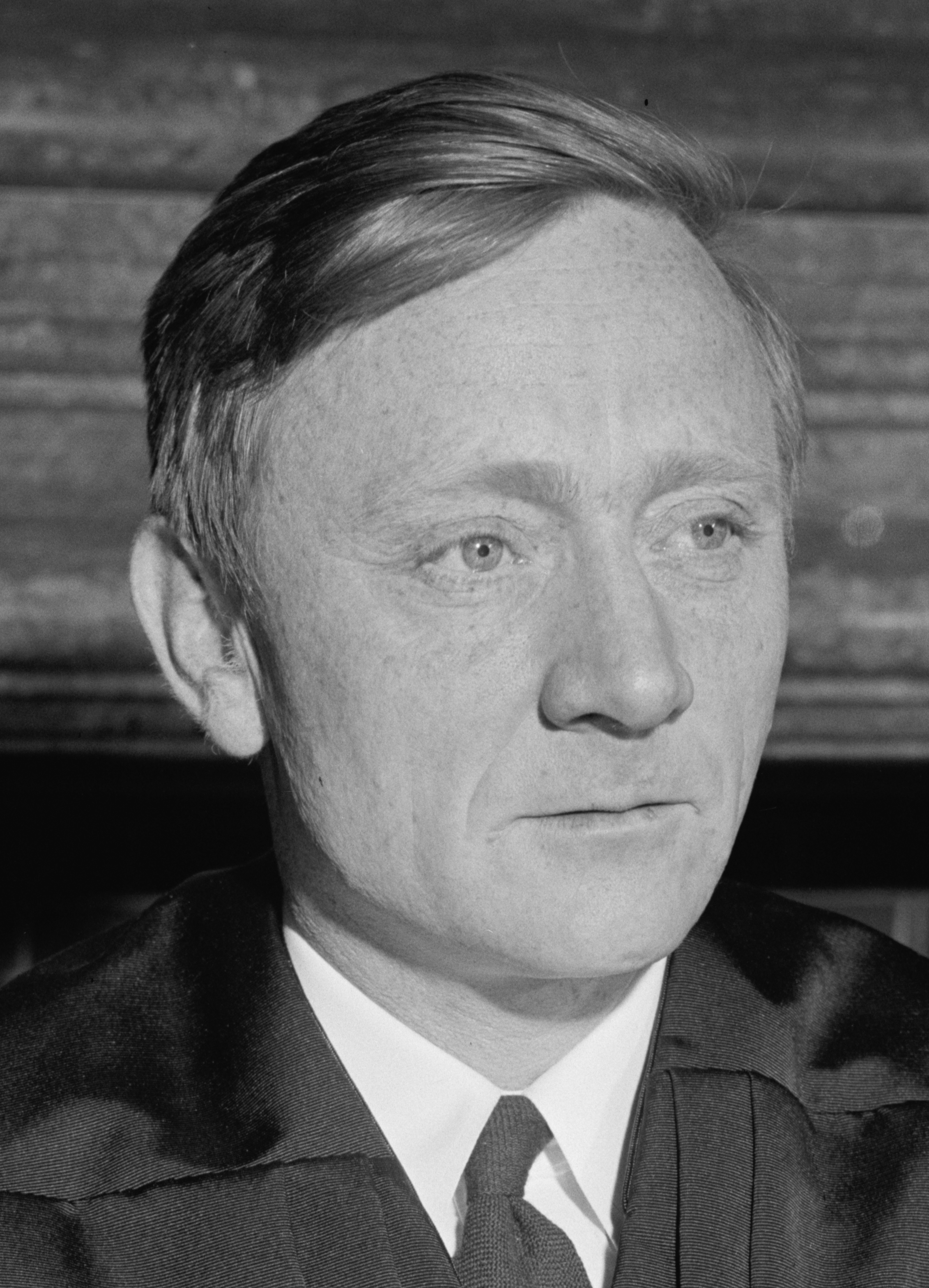
Justice William O. Douglas delivered the opinion of the Court

In Federal Power Commission v. Hope Natural Gas Co., the Supreme Court of the United States upheld the Commission's rate order and declined to review the methodology it had used to determine reasonable rates. The Court indicated that, so long as rates satisfied basic standards of fairness, the method used by a commission to arrive at them—including its choice of rate base—was not subject to judicial review. Justice William O. Douglas emphasized that the rate order would provide the company with earnings sufficient to continue successful operation, maintain its credit, and attract new capital, despite a substantial reduction in earning power.

The Supreme Court agreed with the FPC because the purpose of rate-making was to ensure that consumers were being charged fair and reasonable rates. After reviewing the facts, the Supreme Court began its analysis by reaffirming that the Commission was not bound to use any particular formula or combination of formulas in determining rates, as it had previously held in Federal Power Commission v. Natural Gas Pipeline Company (1942).

The Court emphasized that, although the rates had to be "just and reasonable", the particular method used to determine them was left to regulatory commissions:

Under the statutory standard of "just and reasonable" it is the result reached not the method employed which is controlling. It is not theory but the impact of the rate order which counts. If the total effect of the rate order cannot be said to be unjust and unreasonable, judicial inquiry under the Act is at an end. The fact that the method employed to reach that result may contain infirmities is not then important. Moreover, the Commission's order does not become suspect by reason of the fact that it is challenged. It is the product of expert judgment which carries a presumption of validity.

=== Dissents ===
Justice Felix Frankfurter dissented: "Expertise is a rational process and a rational process implies expressed reasons for judgment".

Justice Justice Jackson dissented, arguing that the Court's treatment of the company's $17 million in well-drilling and other costs seemed "inconsistent with rational rate regulation". Jackson also cautioned that he had "doubts about resting public regulation upon any rule that is to be used or not depending on which side it favors."

== Legacy ==
The Supreme Court closely supervised public utility rate regulation for much of the late 19th and early 20th centuries until Federal Power Commission v. Hope Natural Gas Co. abandoned Smyth v. Ames's emphasis on prescribed valuation methodologies, including the fair value doctrine. This decision reflected a broader shift toward reliance on the expertise of regulatory commissions and marked the Court's retreat from active supervision of utility rate-setting.

During the Progressive Era, Robert Hale's critique of Munn v. Illinois (1877) and Smyth v. Ames doctrines influenced Louis Brandeis, John Bauer, and James C. Bonbright, whose work helped shape the approach later adopted by state utility commissions.

The implications of Federal Power Commission v. Hope Natural Gas Co. for the constitutional requirement of a reasonable return remained contested. Some language in the opinon suggested that, in some circumstances, the public's right to receive utility service at reasonable rates could require regulators to deny investors the opportunity to obtain an adequate return on their capital.

Administrative agencies like the Federal Power Commission later became the target of sustained criticism from some legal scholars, who questioned their compatibility with the constitutional separation of powers.In 1960, the Landis Report, prepared by James M. Landis at the request of President-elect John F. Kennedy, concluded that the president's constitutional authority to "see that the laws are faithfully executed" applied to regulatory agencies "whether technically 'independent' or not." It argued that the Federal Power Commission's failure to administer the natural gas laws was therefore "a matter of constitutional concern" to the president.

In Duquesne Light Co. v. Barasch (1989), the Supreme Court reaffirmed the significance of Federal Power Commission v. Hope Natural Gas Co. in reviewing utility rate regulation and upheld state legislation barring utilities from recovering through rates the costs of power plants that had not been completed or placed into service. Writing for the Court, Chief Justice William H. Rehnquist quoted Hope: "It is not theory, but the impact of the rate order which counts."

== Works cited ==
- Bonbright, James C. (May 1948). "Utility Rate Control Reconsidered in the Light of the Hope Natural Gas Case". The American Economic Review. 38 (2). American Economic Association: 465–482. JSTOR 1910514.
- Brown, Hillyer (1944). "The Ghosts of the Hope Natural Gas Decision". California Law Review. 32 (4): 398–421.
- Hale, Robert L. (May 1942). "Does the Ghost of Smyth v. Ames Still Walk?". Harvard Law Review. 55 (7): 1116–1140.
- Smith, Nelson Lee (1946). "Rate Regulation by the Federal Power Commission". The American Economic Review. 36 (2): 405–425. JSTOR 1818221.
