= Smyth v. Ames =

- Supreme Court of the United States

Submitted May 9, 1898 Decided May 31, 1898
- Full case name: Smyth, Attorney General, et al. v. Ames, et al.; Smyth, Attorney General, et al. v. Smith, et al.; Smyth, Attorney General, et al. v. Higginson, et al.
- Citations: 171 U.S. 361 (more) 18 S. Ct. 888; 43 L. Ed. 197; 1898 U.S. LEXIS 1608

Holding
- Voided Nebraska railroad tariffs and defined the constitutional limits of governmental power to set railroad and utility rates.

Court membership
- Chief Justice Melville Fuller Associate Justices John M. Harlan · Horace Gray; David J. Brewer · Henry B. Brown; George Shiras Jr. · Edward D. White; Rufus W. Peckham · Joseph McKenna

Case opinion
- Majority: Harlan, joined by unanimous

Laws applied
- Fourteenth Amendment to the United States Constitution, Contract Clause
- Overruled by
- Federal Power Commission v. Hope Natural Gas Co., 320 U.S. 591 (1944)

Smyth v. Ames, 171 U.S. 361 (1898), also called The Maximum Freight Case, was an 1898 United States Supreme Court case. The Supreme Court voided a Nebraska railroad tariff law, declaring that it violated the Fourteenth Amendment to the United States Constitution in that it takes property without the due process of law. The Court defined the constitutional limits of governmental power to set railroad and utility rates by stating that regulated industries have the right to a "fair return". The ruling was later overturned in Federal Power Commission v. Hope Natural Gas Company (1944).

The decision in Smyth v. Ames was unanimous and Justice John M. Harlan delivered the opinion of the Court in writing.

== Background ==
The valuation of a utility's property became a basis for determining allowable rates of return in the late nineteenth century. In 1896, a lower court first applied this approach in San Diego, etc. v. Jasper, holding that the actual value of a utility's property at the time rates were established should form the basis for calculating just rates. Two years later, the Supreme Court of the United States accepted the so-called fair value doctrine in Smyth v. Ames (1898), holding that a utility's rate base should provide a fair return on the value of property used to provide utility service to the public.

== Legal background ==
On April 12, 1893, Nebraska passed a law, a so-called "maximum rate bill", establishing maximum rates for the transportation of freights within the state. The Railroad Commissioners of Nebraska were empowered to reduce any freight rate.

Several precedents had been set by the Supreme Court regarding state control over railways. Until Munn v. Illinois when the Granger Laws were declared constitutional, it had been held that railway property was protected from state authority by the Contract Clause of the Constitution, which states that no state shall pass any "Law impairing the Obligation of Contracts". However, in the Munn case, the Court ruled that all property was held subject to legislative regulation if it was "affected with a public interest". Further decisions built off the Munn decision, specifying that while the legislature may regulate property "affected by the public interest", they must exercise it reasonably by applying the used and useful principle, so as to not deprive citizens of their property without due process of law.

== Supreme Court ==
The maximum rate law was contested by the Union Pacific, St. Joseph and Grand Island Railway, Omaha and Republican Valley Railway, and the Kansas City and Omaha Railway. They claimed the law was confiscation, and therefore unconstitutional. They said the law would make a difference of $2,250,00 annually.

The Supreme Court unanimously found the law unconstitutiona and identified several factors that public utility commissions should consider when determining the fair value of a utility's property for rate-making purposes. These were the original cost of construction, including the cost of extensions and permanent improvements; the amount and market value of the utility's outstanding bonds and stock, representing its capitalized and commercial value; and the difference between the original cost of construction and the current cost of replacing the utility's physical property. The Court also left room for consideration of other costs that might be relevant to determining the value of a utility's property, providing flexibility for future rate-making proceedings.

== Significance ==
Under Smyth v. Ames, the Supreme Court treated the rate base—the value assigned to a utility's property used to provide public service—as a separate inquiry from the reasonable rate of return. The Court recognized that a well-managed utility was entitled to earnings sufficient to maintain its credit and obtain the capital necessary to perform its public duties, but required the rate base to be measured by the separate standard of fair value. James Bonbright argued that this combination of a rate of return sufficient to maintain a utility's credit with a fair-value rate base unrelated to its capital structure may have resulted from conflating two distinct financial considerations: the return on new capital needed to attract investors and the annual return on existing capital needed to enable a utility to issue new securities on favorable terms.

Businessmen were pleased by the decision, and believed it would give stability to railroad investments. Others were unhappy.

The Interstate Commerce Commission was weakened by the Court's decision.

== Later developments ==
Gerard C. Henderson's described the "fair value" doctrine as a "gigantic illusion" that belonged among the "great juristic myths of history" and had no practical value as a basis for determining rates. His remarks were later quoted with approval by Justices Hugo Black, William O. Douglas, and Frank Murphy in their concurring opinion in Federal Power Commission v. Natural Gas Pipeline Co. (1942), while Justice Harlan Fiske Stone cited a similar criticism in his dissent in West v. Chesapeake & Potomac Telephone Co. (1935).

The fair value doctrine remained an important principle of utility rate regulation for decades. In Federal Power Commission v. Hope Natural Gas Co. (1944), however, the Supreme Court abandoned the requirement that utility rates be based on a fair valuation of the utility's property. The Court instead emphasized whether the rates as a whole were just and reasonable, leaving greater responsibility for determining reasonable rates to legislatures and regulatory commissions. Hope Natural Gas effectively ended the status of the fair-value doctrine as a constitutional requirement, although states remained free to retain it as a matter of state law.
