= Used and Useful Principle =

In the utilities industry, the Used and Useful Principle is a concept that requires energy assets to be physically used and useful to current ratepayers before those ratepayers can be asked to pay the costs associated with them. This is a fundamental principle of utility regulation.

The used and useful principle precedes the prudent investment rule and is established in law. In Smyth v. Ames, 169 U.S. 466 (1898), a test was formulated by the United States Supreme Court to measure the extent to which regulated companies were protected from legislative expropriation on behalf of the public. In reviewing the interests of the customers versus the interests of the company, the United States Supreme Court connected the concept of whether or not something is used or useful to the public service provided to determine rates. This case provided the legal foundation for the idea that only property serving the public is eligible to earn a rate of return.

The principle of used and useful also provides a way to place definite limitations on costs charged to utility customers. Not only must it be proven that utility investments and expenditures are used and useful to the ratepayers, the company must show that investments that are out of date technologically or economically are excluded from the rate base. The test keeps utility companies from investing in assets that do not provide a useful service and also to prevent any deliberate over-investing in an asset to purposefully inflate the rate base. This protects the ratepayer but, unlike the review for prudency, the used and useful test does not take the loss of the shareholder or investor into consideration.

== Application ==
=== Fair Value Doctrine ===
Smyth v. Ames set a precedent for the worth of utility property to be evaluated based on fair value. "The basis of all calculations as to the reasonableness of rates to be charged by a corporation...must be the fair value of the property being used by it for the convenience of the public." (ROSE, KENNETH "Electric Power: Traditional Monopoly Franchise Regulation and Rate Making."Encyclopedia of Energy. Oxford: Elsevier Science & Technology, 2004) Fair value was used to determine a rate base for almost fifty years.

With the case Federal Power Commission v. Hope Natural Gas Co., 320 U.S. 591 (1944) rate base formulation moved from being based on fair value to using the measure of prudent investment. This changed the focus for review to be on the "end result" instead of looking at specific property value or a formula for rate base. Despite this change, the used and useful test remained part of the rate base evaluation.

== Exceptions ==
=== Construction Work In Progress (CWIP) ===
In 1967, predictions for energy demand and nuclear capacity were given through the year 2000. Construction began on many nuclear reactors based on these predictions but due to the length of time to build the reactors, high inflations rates and the Middle East oil boycott of 1973 many of these projects were canceled in various stages of completion.

It was during this time that CWIP was introduced. When CWIP is included in the rate base, the used and useful test is bypassed. The utility is allowed to collect recovery costs before the project is completed.

In 1976 the Federal Power Commission announced a policy change stating that CWIP could only be included in the rate base when the utility was, "in severe financial distress." This reduces the total cost of the project and is seen to benefit the consumer. This perceived benefit is controversial due to the fact that it is usually the future ratepayer that receives the benefit while the customers who paid during construction have moved on.

Construction costs not allowed in the rate base may still be eligible to accrue interest through Allowance for Funds Used During Construction (AFUDC). This interest is added into the rate base when the project is completed.
