= Yick Wo v. Hopkins =

Yick Wo v. Hopkins Wo Lee v. Hopkins
- Supreme Court of the United States

Submitted April 14, 1886 Decided May 10, 1886
- Full case name: Yick Wo v. Hopkins, Sheriff
- Citations: 118 U.S. 356 (more) 6 S. Ct. 1064; 30 L. Ed. 220; 1886 U.S. LEXIS 1938

Case history
- Prior: In re Yick Wo, writ of habeas corpus denied, 9 P. 139 (Cal. 1885); In re Wo Lee, writ of habeas corpus denied, 26 F. 471 (D. Cal. 1886)

Holding
- 1. Racially discriminatory application of a racially neutral statute violates the Equal Protection Clause of the Fourteenth Amendment. 2. Non-citizens in the jurisdiction of the United States have equal protection rights. Supreme Court of California and Circuit Court for the District of California reversed.

Court membership
- Chief Justice Morrison Waite Associate Justices Samuel F. Miller · Stephen J. Field; Joseph P. Bradley · John M. Harlan; William B. Woods · Stanley Matthews; Horace Gray · Samuel Blatchford

Case opinion
- Majority: Matthews, joined by unanimous

Laws applied
- Equal Protection Clause of the U.S. Const. amend. XIV

Yick Wo v. Hopkins, 118 U.S. 356 (1886), is a landmark decision of the United States Supreme Court in which the Court ruled that a prima facie race-neutral law administered in a prejudicial manner infringed upon the right to equal protection guaranteed by the Fourteenth Amendment to the U.S. Constitution.

== Background ==
Yick Wo (Chinese: 益和; Jyutping: jik1 wo4) was a laundry facility owned by Lee Yick, an immigrant from China who moved to San Francisco in 1861. The laundry was located at 349 Third Street in what is now known as the SoMa neighborhood. Today, because of changes in street layout after the 1906 earthquake, the exact location where Lee Yick’s laundromat once was is now a parking lot at the corner Third and Harrison street.

Yick ran the laundry for 22 years and held a license from the Board of Fire Wardens and a certificate of inspection from the city health officer without issue. In 1880, the San Francisco Board of Supervisors passed an ordinance making it illegal to operate a laundry in a wooden building without a permit from the Board. Under the new ordinance, Yick was granted a license in 1884 to operate his laundry facility in the wooden building where he was located.

Yick's application for renewal of his permit in June 1885 was denied, not allowing him to continue operating his laundry in a wooden building. When his original permit expired in October 1885 he was required by law to shut down. However, he refused to close down his business and was convicted for violating the ordinance. He was fined ten dollars ($333.62 in 2025) and imprisoned for refusing to pay the fine. When Sheriff Peter Hopkins arrested Lee Yick, he booked him under the name Yick Wo, mistakenly assuming this name from the name displayed on Yick’s laundry. After he was imprisoned, on August 24, 1885, he petitioned the California Supreme Court for a writ of habeas corpus.

Of 320 laundries operated in wooden buildings in San Francisco at the time, over 200 were owned by Chinese. When the 200 Chinese owned laundry owners tried to renew their permits, only one permit was granted. Whereas, the non-Chinese applicants with the exception of one, all were granted.

== San Francisco ordinance ==
Order No. 156, passed May 26, 1880

SEC. 1. It shall be unlawful, from and after the passage of this order, for any person or persons to establish, maintain, or carry on a laundry within the corporate limits of the city and county of San Francisco without having first obtained the consent of the board of supervisors, except the same be located in a building constructed either of brick or stone.

SEC. 2. It shall be unlawful for any person to erect, build, or maintain, or cause to be erected, built, or maintained, over or upon the roof of any building now erected or which may hereafter be erected within the limits of said city and county, any scaffolding without first obtaining the written permission of the board of supervisors, which permit shall state fully for what purpose said scaffolding is to be erected and used, and such scaffolding shall not be used for any other purpose than that designated in such permit.

SEC. 3. Any person who shall violate any of the provisions of this order shall be deemed guilty of a misdemeanor, and upon conviction thereof shall be punished by a fine of not more than one thousand dollars, or by imprisonment in the county jail, not more than six months, or by both such fine and imprisonment.

== Issue ==
The central issue of the case was whether the enforcement of the new requirements for laundries operated in wooden buildings violated Yick Wo's protections found in the United States Constitution. The Equal Protection Clause can be found in the 14th amendment of the United States Constitution. It requires that "no state...deny to any person within its jurisdiction the equal protection of the laws." There is also the issue around whether a law can be written in a neutral way but enforced discriminately.

== Arguments ==
Lee Yick was financially supported by the Chinese Six Companies (now named the “Chinese Consolidated Benevolent Association”), which raised $20,000 to hire attorney Hall McAllister, a former U.S. Circuit Court of California judge and founder of the California Bar Association. McAllister argued that because Chinese laundrymen could not receive a fair hearing in California, that the case therefore required federal review.

The state argued that the ordinance was strictly one out of concern for safety. Laundries of the day often needed very hot stoves to boil water for laundry, and laundry fires were not unknown and often resulted in the destruction of adjoining buildings as well.

The argument on the side of the petitioner was about the administration of the new ordinance. The counsel strove to show that while Chinese applicants were denied permits to continue running their laundries in wooden buildings, non-Chinese individuals were nearly all granted permits under the same ordinance. The petitioner pointed out that prior to the new ordinance, the inspection and approval of laundries in wooden buildings had been left up to fire wardens. Wo's laundry had never failed an inspection for fire safety. Moreover, the application of the prior law focused only on laundries in crowded areas of the city, while the new law was being enforced on isolated wooden buildings as well. The law also ignored other wooden buildings where fires were common—even cooking stoves posed the same risk as those used for laundries.

== Opinion of the Court ==
The Court, in a unanimous opinion written by Justice Matthews, found that the Chinese laundry owners were protected from discriminatory state action by the equal protection clause even if they were not American citizens:

These provisions are universal in their application, to all persons within the territorial jurisdiction, without regard to any differences of race, of color, or of nationality.

The Court struck down the ordinance. While the ordinance was not discriminatory against a racial or ethnic group in its text, the discriminatory enforcement and intent to close down Chinese-owned laundries infringed upon their "fundamental rights to life liberty and the pursuit of happiness" by destroying "their harmless and useful occupation, on which they depend for a livelihood." The Court said the deprivation of property was arbitrary and unconstitutional because the 14th amendments guarantee of equal protection applies to "all persons within the territorial jurisdiction", including non-citizens. As Justice Anthony Kennedy has explained, the holding of Yick Wo is about purposeful discrimination:

The holding of Yick Wo was that a law that's administered with an evil eye or an unequal hand violates [a person's] right to equal protection.

== Legacy ==
The Chinese Exclusion Act, passed in 1882, restricted the entry of Chinese immigrant laborers while subsequent legislation imposed further restrictions, including heightened evidentiary standards on Chinese immigrants seeking admission, prohibiting the reentry of outbound Chinese immigrants, and more. In various decisions throughout of the later 19th century, the Supreme Court upheld such laws on the basis that they applied to new arrivals to the United States and not immigrants with permanent domicile.

In Wong Kim Ark v. United States the Court recognized that the 14th amendment right to jus soli citizenship applied for Chinese born in the United States based on Yick Wo. The federal government's argument was about the text of the 14th amendment: "All persons born or naturalized in the United States, and subject to the jurisdiction thereof, are citizens of the United States and of the State wherein they reside." The government argued that the jurisdiction requirement was not merely territorial, but required citizens be politically subject to the laws of the United States. Writing for the majority Justice Horace Gray relied heavily on the Yick Wo precedent to reaffirm the principle that 14th amendment guarantee of equal protection does not have a heightened subjecthood requirement for Chinese people:

Chinese persons, born out of the United States, remaining subjects of the Emperor of China, and not having become citizens of the United States, are entitled to the protection of, and owe allegiance to the United States, so long as they are permitted by the United States to reside here; and are “subject to the jurisdiction thereof,” in the same sense as all other aliens residing in the United States.

Yick Wo is cited in Hirabayashi v. United States to recognize that: "Distinctions between citizens solely based because of their ancestry are by their very nature odious to a free people whose institutions are founded upon the doctrine of equality. For that reason, legislative classification or discrimination based on race alone has often been held to be a denial of equal protection." However, the US Supreme Court upheld the conviction of Gordon Hirabayashi, the Japanese American who tested the curfew law and refused to register for the forced internment of people of Japanese descent during World War II.

In San Francisco there is a public school named Yick Wo Alternative Elementary School in honor of Yick Wo.

During his confirmation hearing Anthony Kennedy's written answers to Senator Joseph Biden included a quote from Flores v. Pierce, a 9th Circuit decision he wrote applying Yick Wo to uphold a judgment against municipal officials who had a "history of racially motivated activity" against Hispanics:

One of the first cases interpreting the equal protection clause stands for the rule, among others, that the effect of a law may be so harsh or adverse in its weight against a particular race that an intent to discriminate is not only a permissible inference but also a necessary one. Yick Wo v. Hopkins, 118 U.S. 356 In the instant case, the disparate effect of the action on Mexican-Americans was so compelling that the effect may approach, if it does not reach, the demonstration of an intent to discriminate that was made in Yick Wo v. Hopkins.

== See also ==
- Chinese American
- Chinese Hand Laundry Alliance
- List of United States Supreme Court cases, volume 118
