= Prudent Investment Rule =

In the utilities industry, the Prudent Investment Rule refers to a series of state standards which determine the fiscal soundness of a utility in the course of rate recovery for recoverable capital costs to be determined by that state’s Public Service Commission (PSC). The determination is established through a series of filings from the utility to the PSC and hearings conducted by the PSC. This occurs during a prudency hearing. The PSC follows these standards to determine if the capital costs were a "prudent investment". To determine the prudency of the investment, the PSC applies the prudent investment test or standard, determining if the costs were reasonable at the time they were incurred, and given the circumstances and what was known or knowable at the time, are to be included in the firm's rates. It is commonly used as an oversight tool by the government to ensure that money invested into a project is being spent as it was intended so the utility may recoup some costs in construction through a recovery in rates, hence the title prudent investment rule. Regulators can consider cases of hidden imprudence, but are required to consider what was known or knowable at the time the decision was made by the PSC.

The term Prudent Investment Rule, and the associated standards, have been established through a series of legal precedents. The first case to set precedent was the United States Supreme Court case of Munn v. Illinois in 1877, which allowed states to have a say in rates. Once the nature of recoverable capital costs was defined, a second question remained as to the rate at which that capital could be recovered. This issue was reasonably addressed in 1935 in Bluefield Water Works & Improvement Co. v. Public Service Commission of West Virginia, when the court said that a public utility is entitled to such rates as will permit it to earn a return equal to that generally being made at the same time and in the same general part of the country on investments in other business undertakings which are attended by corresponding risks and uncertainties.

== Disallowance ==
According to Oak Ridge National Laboratory, there are five categories that plants under construction may fall into that keep them from being included in the rate base.

1. Imprudence: When a utility fails to show that it made prudent decisions in Public Service Commission hearings, then the facility being reviewed is disallowed from the rate base.
2. Excess Capacity: Regardless of prudence, a plant recently constructed may not be included in the rate base if it is ruled to have a generating capacity that is in excess of what is needed by the ratepayers. Each jurisdiction will calculate excess capacity differently. This is not a permanent disallowance and if the need of the customer or ratepayer grows then the plant can again be included in the rate base.
3. Cost Caps: In rare cases the Public Utilities Commission will set a cap on construction costs for a new facility. If the plant is completed at a higher cost, then this excess cost may not be allowed in the rate base.
4. Economic Value: The actual economic value of the recently constructed plant may be found to be less than the construction costs. A plant under construction should be regularly evaluated to ensure that continued construction is in the best interest of the ratepayer.
5. Other: This category includes any other reason that a facility may be disallowed from the rate base. This includes canceled construction. If a plant is canceled then it is not “used and useful” and may be completely disallowed from the rate base or allowed to recover prudent costs with no return recovery on the balance or allowed to recover prudent costs with a recovery of the debt return from the unrecovered balance.
