= In the Courts of the Conqueror =

2010 book by Walter R. Echo-Hawk

In the Courts of the Conqueror: The 10 Worst Indian Law Cases Ever Decided
- Author: Walter R. Echo-Hawk
- Language: English
- Subject: Indians of North America — Legal status, laws, etc — Cases; Indians of North America — Legal status, laws, etc — History
- Published: 2010
- Publisher: Fulcrum Publishing
- Publication place: United States
- Media type: Print, hardcover, paperback, electronic
- Pages: 560 pp.
- ISBN: 9781936218011
- OCLC: 845875403
- Dewey Decimal: 342.7308/72
- LC Class: KF8204.5 .E28 2010

In the Courts of the Conqueror: The 10 Worst Indian Law Cases Ever Decided is a 2010 legal non-fiction book by Walter R. Echo-Hawk, a Justice of the Supreme Court of the Pawnee Nation, an adjunct professor of law at the University of Tulsa College of Law, and of counsel with Crowe & Dunlevy.

== Synopsis ==
The book draws from both well-known decisions of federal courts as well as less well known cases in explaining the doctrines of federal Indian law. The case of Johnson v. McIntosh by the Supreme Court in 1823 is well known to most law students as declaring that Indian tribes had the right to occupy the land but only the United States held title to the land by right of discovery.

It covers other major cases, including Cherokee Nation v. Georgia (1831) (the tribe lacked standing to contest Georgia's violation of treaty rights), Lone Wolf v. Hitchcock (1903) (the U.S. had the right to confiscate Indian lands unilaterally despite treaty provisions); and Tee-Hit-Ton Indians v. United States (1955) (discovery and conquest doctrines applied even when the Alaskan natives had separate dealings with Russia).

The book covers cases involving the adoption of Indian children against the will of the tribes, leading to the Indian Child Welfare Act; decisions allowing the desecration of Indian graveyards and the display of Indians remains, leading to the Native American Graves Protection and Repatriation Act; and cases on Indian religious practices, such as Lyng v. Northwest Indian Cemetery Protective Association (1988) and Employment Division v. Smith (1990). Echo-Hawk notes how federal Indian law was formed defining Indian rights and were then used, not as a shield to protect these rights, but instead to strip them away and harm Indian people.

== Reviews ==
The book has received positive reviews from a good number of academic sources. Gilles Renaud of the Ontario Court of Justice stated that the book's greatest contribution may be in explain to Native American people why they now possess so little land and have so many problems. Another review points out the injustice identified in the book and recommends that it be required reading at the Harvard, Yale, and Stanford law schools since those schools produce many Supreme Court justices.

In addition, the book has received good reviews from the Native American community to western themed magazines. The legal community has also received it well, with one reviewer asking, "What if it is really true that the bundle of rights we have fought for through the 5th and 14th Amendments to the U.S. Constitution were never intended by the “founders” to be applied to Native Americans?" The Smithsonian Institution's National Museum of the American Indian invited Echo-Hawk to participate in a symposium in part due to the impact of the book.
