= Santa Clara County v. Southern Pacific Railroad Co. =

Santa Clara County v. Southern Pacific Railroad
- Supreme Court of the United States

Argued January 26–29, 1886 Decided May 10, 1886
- Full case name: Santa Clara County v. Southern Pacific Railroad Company
- Citations: 118 U.S. 394 (more) 6 S. Ct. 1132; 30 L. Ed. 118; 1886 U.S. LEXIS 1942

Case history
- Prior: Error to the Circuit Court of the United States for the District of California

Holding
- The Fourteenth Amendment to the Constitution of the United States recognizes legal entities as "persons" (per headnote).

Court membership
- Chief Justice Morrison Waite Associate Justices Samuel F. Miller · Stephen J. Field; Joseph P. Bradley · John M. Harlan; William B. Woods · Stanley Matthews; Horace Gray · Samuel Blatchford

Case opinion
- Majority: Harlan, joined unanimously

Laws applied
- 14 Stat. 292, §§ 1, 2, 3, 11, 18 (an Act of 1866 giving special privileges to the Atlantic and Pacific Railway Corporation)

Santa Clara County v. Southern Pacific Railroad Company, 118 U.S. 394 (1886), is a corporate law case of the United States Supreme Court that concerned the taxation of railroad property. The case arose when several railroads refused to follow a California state law that gave less favorable tax treatment to some assets owned by corporations as compared to assets owned by individuals, which the railroads argued was a violation of the Equal Protection Clause, but ultimately the case was decided on statutory grounds in favor of the railroads, with the opinion written by John Marshall Harlan.

The case is controversial for its headnote, which summarized it as holding that the Fourteenth Amendment recognizes corporate personhood, even though the case itself "did not rule on the Fourteenth Amendment." However, the first case to directly rule on constitutional corporate personhood, Pembina Consolidated Silver Mining Co. v. Pennsylvania (1888), reached the same conclusion as the headnote.

== Facts ==
At the California Constitutional Convention of 1878–79, the state legislature drew up a new constitution that denied railroads "the right to deduct the amount of their debts [i.e., mortgages] from the taxable value of their property, a right which was given to individuals." Southern Pacific Railroad Company refused to pay taxes under these new changes. The taxpaying railroads challenged this law, based on a conflicting federal statute of 1866 which gave them privileges inconsistent with state taxation (14 Stat. 292, §§ 1, 2, 3, 11, 18).

San Mateo County, along with neighboring counties, filed suit against the railroads to recoup the massive losses in tax revenue stemming from Southern Pacific's refusal to pay. After hearing arguments in San Mateo County v. Southern Pacific Railroad Company, the California Supreme Court sided with the county.

The Supreme Court of the United States issued an opinion consolidating three separate cases: Santa Clara County v. Southern Pacific Railroad Company, California v. Central Pacific Railroad Company, and California v. Southern Pacific Railroad Company.

=== Headnote ===
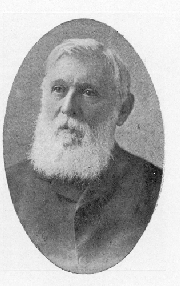
Bancroft Davis, the Reporter of Decisions and former president of Newburgh and New York Railway

The headnote, which is "not the work of the Court, but is simply the work of the Reporter, giving his understanding of the decision, prepared for the convenience of the profession", was written by the Reporter of Decisions, former president of the Newburgh and New York Railway Company J.C. Bancroft Davis. He said the following:

One of the points made and discussed at length in the brief of counsel for defendants in error was that 'corporations are persons within the meaning of the Fourteenth Amendment to the Constitution of the United States.' Before argument, Mr. Chief Justice Waite said: The court does not wish to hear argument on the question whether the provision in the Fourteenth Amendment to the Constitution, which forbids a State to deny to any person within its jurisdiction the equal protection of the laws, applies to these corporations. We are all of the opinion that it does.

So the headnote was a reporting by the Reporter of Decisions of the Chief Justice's interpretation of the Justices' opinions. But the issue of applicability of "Equal Protection to any persons" to the railroads was not addressed in the decision of the Court in the case.

Before publication in United States Reports, Davis wrote a letter to Chief Justice Morrison Waite, dated May 26, 1886, to make sure his headnote was correct:

Dear Chief Justice,

I have a memorandum in the California Cases Santa Clara County v. Southern Pacific &c As follows. In opening the Court stated that it did not wish to hear argument on the question whether the Fourteenth Amendment applies to such corporations as are parties in these suits. All the Judges were of the opinion that it does.

Waite replied:

I think your mem. in the California Railroad Tax cases expresses with sufficient accuracy what was said before the argument began. I leave it with you to determine whether anything need be said about it in the report inasmuch as we avoided meeting the constitutional question in the decision.

C. Peter Magrath, who discovered the exchange while researching Morrison R. Waite: The Triumph of Character, writes "In other words, to the Reporter fell the decision which enshrined the declaration in the United States Reports...had Davis left it out, Santa Clara County v. Southern Pac. R. Co. would have been lost to history among thousands of uninteresting tax cases." At the same time, the correspondence makes clear that the headnote does reflect the Court's thinking, at least before hearing any arguments to the contrary.

Author Jack Beatty wrote about the lingering questions as to how the reporter's note reflected a quotation that was absent from the opinion itself.

Why did the chief justice issue his dictum? Why did he leave it up to Davis to include it in the headnotes? After Waite told him that the Court 'avoided' the issue of corporate personhood, why did Davis include it? Why, indeed, did he begin his headnote with it? The opinion made plain that the Court did not decide the corporate personality issue and the subsidiary equal protection issue.

=== Defense argument ===
While the decision of the Court did not rest on the Fourteenth Amendment, an argument on this ground had been delivered by the defense:

That the provisions of the Constitution and laws of California in respect to the assessment for taxation of the property of railway corporations operating railroads in more than one county, are in violation of the Fourteenth Amendment of the Constitution insofar as they require the assessment of their property at its full money value without making deduction, as in the case of railroads operated in one county and of other corporations and of natural persons, for the value of the mortgages covering the property assessed, thus imposing upon the defendant unequal burdens, and to that extent denying to it the equal protection of the laws.

== Judgment ==
A unanimous decision, written by Justice Harlan, ruled on the matter of fences, holding that the state of California illegally included the fences running beside the tracks in its assessment of the total value of the railroad's property. As a result, the county could not collect taxes from Southern Pacific that it was not allowed to collect in the first place. This meant that the more significant question of the Equal Protection Clause was never actually addressed.

The special grounds of defense by each of the defendants were:

1. That its road is a part of a continuous postal and military route, constructed and maintained under the authority of the United States by means in part obtained from the general government; that the company having, with the consent of the state, become subject to the requirements, conditions, and provisions of the acts of Congress, it thereby ceased to be merely a state corporation and became one of the agencies or instrumentalities employed by the general government to execute its constitutional powers, and that the franchise to operate a postal and military route, for the transportation of troops, munitions of war, public stores, and the mails, being derived from the United States, cannot without their consent be subjected to state taxation.
2. That the provisions of the Constitution and laws of California in respect to the assessment for taxation of the property of railway corporations operating railroads in more than one county, are in violation of the Fourteenth Amendment of the Constitution insofar as they require the assessment of their property at its full money value without making deduction, as in the case of railroads operated in one county and of other corporations and of natural persons, for the value of the mortgages covering the property assessed, thus imposing upon the defendant unequal burdens, and to that extent denying to it the equal protection of the laws.
3. That what is known as § 3664 of the Political Code of California, under the authority of which, in part, the assessment was made, was not constitutionally enacted by the legislature, and had not the force of law.
4. That no void assessment appears in fact to have been made by the state board.
5. That no interest is recoverable in this action until after judgment.
6. That the assessment upon which the action is based is void because it included property which the State Board of Equalization had no jurisdiction under any circumstances to assess, and that as such illegal part was so blended with the balance that it cannot be separated, the entire assessment must be treated as a nullity.

The record contains elaborate opinions stating the grounds upon which judgments were ordered for the defendants. Mr. Justice Field overruled the first of the special defenses above named, but sustained the second. The circuit judge in addition held that § 3664 of the Political Code had not been passed in the mode required by the state constitution, and consequently was no part of the law of California. These opinions are reported as the Santa Clara Railroad Tax Case, 18 F. 385.

The propositions embodied in the conclusions reached in the circuit court were discussed with marked ability by counsel who appeared in this Court for the respective parties. Their importance cannot well be over-estimated, for they not only involve a construction of the recent amendments to the national Constitution in their application to the constitution and the legislation of a state, but upon their determination, if it were necessary to consider them, would depend the system of taxation devised by that state for raising revenue from certain corporations for the support of her government. These questions belong to a class which this Court should not decide unless their determination is essential to the disposal of the case in which they arise. Whether the present cases require a decision of them depends upon the soundness of another proposition upon which the court below, in view of its conclusions upon other issues, did not deem it necessary to pass. We allude to the claim of the defendant in each case that the entire assessment is a nullity upon the ground that the State Board of Equalization included therein property which it was without jurisdiction to assess for taxation.

The argument in behalf of the defendant is that the state board knowingly and designedly included in its assessment of "the franchise, roadway, roadbed, rails, and rolling stock" of each company, the value of the fences erected upon the line between its roadway and the land of coterminous proprietors; that the fences did not constitute a part of such roadway, and therefore could only be assessed for taxation by the proper officer of the several counties in which they were situated, and that an entire assessment which includes property not assessable by the state board against the party assessed, is void, and therefore insufficient to support an action, at least when -- and such is claimed to be the case here -- it does not appear with reasonable certainty from the face of the assessment or otherwise what part of the aggregate valuation represents the property so illegally included therein.

If these positions are tenable, there will be no occasion to consider the grave questions of constitutional law upon which the case was determined below, for in that event the judgment can be affirmed upon the ground that the assessment cannot properly be the basis of a judgment against the defendant.

== Significance ==
Although the Supreme Court's actual decision never hinged on the equal protection claims, the case has been allowed to have clear constitutional consequences, as it has been subsequently cited as affirming the protection of corporations under the Fourteenth Amendment. At the very least, this is an unusual exception to the normal understanding of the workings of the Court's rule of stare decisis – the reliance on precedent. It is an instance in which a statement which is neither part of the ruling of the Court, nor part of the opinion of a majority or dissenting minority of the Court has been cited as precedent in subsequent decisions of the Court.

In his dissent in the 1938 case of Connecticut General Life Insurance Company v. Johnson, Justice Hugo Black wrote

in 1886, this Court in the case of Santa Clara County v. Southern Pacific Railroad, decided for the first time that the word 'person' in the amendment did in some instances include corporations. [...] The history of the amendment proves that the people were told that its purpose was to protect weak and helpless human beings and were not told that it was intended to remove corporations in any fashion from the control of state governments. [...] The language of the amendment itself does not support the theory that it was passed for the benefit of corporations.

Justice William O. Douglas wrote in 1949,

the Santa Clara case becomes one of the most momentous of all our decisions. [...] Corporations were now armed with constitutional prerogatives.

== See also ==
- United States corporate law
- Corporate personhood
- Juristic person
- Johnson v. Southern Pacific Co.: U.S. Supreme Court case involving Southern Pacific's unsuccessful challenge to a federal safety law
- Southern Pacific Company v. Arizona: U.S. Supreme Court case involving Southern Pacific's successful challenge to a state safety law
- List of United States Supreme Court cases, volume 118
- Citizens United v. Federal Election Commission
- McCutcheon v. FEC
