= Falbo v. United States =

- Supreme Court of the United States

Argued November 19, 1943 Decided January 3, 1944
- Full case name: Falbo v. United States
- Citations: 320 U.S. 549 (more) 64 S. Ct. 346; 88 L. Ed. 305

Case history
- Prior: United States v. Falbo, 135 F.2d 464 (3d Cir. 1943); cert. granted, 320 U.S. 209 (1943).
- Subsequent: Rehearing denied, 321 U.S. 802 (1944), 322 U.S. 770 (1944).

Court membership
- Chief Justice Harlan F. Stone Associate Justices Owen Roberts · Hugo Black; Stanley F. Reed · Felix Frankfurter; William O. Douglas · Frank Murphy; Robert H. Jackson · Wiley B. Rutledge

Case opinions
- Majority: Black, joined by Stone, Roberts, Reed, Frankfurter, Douglas, Jackson
- Concurrence: Rutledge
- Dissent: Murphy

Falbo v. United States, 320 U.S. 549 (1944), was a case in which the Supreme Court of the United States held that a draft board's alleged error in classifying a Jehovah's Witness as a conscientious objector rather than a minister of religion is no defense to the board's order to report for national service; post-reporting review of the classification is sufficient due process.

== Background ==
When the Selective Service and Training Act was passed in September 1940, most of the world was at war. The preamble of the Act declared it 'imperative to increase and train the personnel of the armed forces of the United States.' The danger of attack by enemies, if not imminent, was real, as subsequent events would grimly demonstrate. Congress was faced with the urgent necessity of integrating all the nation's people and forces for national defense.

The petitioner was indicted on November 12, 1942, in a federal District Court in Pennsylvania for knowingly failing to perform a duty required of him under the Selective Training and Service Act of 1940. The particular charge was that after his local board had classified him as a conscientious objector, he wilfully failed to obey the board's order to report for assignment to work of national importance. Admitting that his refusal to obey the order was wilful, the petitioner defended his conduct on the ground that he was entitled to a statutory exemption from all forms of national service since the facts he had presented to the board showed that he was a 'regular or duly ordained' minister.

== Prior history ==
The result of the trial was a conviction and sentence to imprisonment for five years. On appeal, the petitioner urged that the District Court had erred in refusing to permit a trial de novo on the merits of his claimed exemption.

In the alternative, he argued that at least, the Court should have reviewed the classification order to ascertain whether the local board had been 'prejudicial, unfair, and arbitrary' in that it had failed to admit certain evidence that he offered, had acted on the basis of an antipathy to the religious sect of which he is a member, and had refused to classify him as a minister, despite the overwhelming weight of the evidence.

== Decision ==
The Circuit Court of Appeals affirmed the District Court per curiam, and the Supreme Court agreed.

== Dissenting opinion ==
Justice Murphy wrote a dissenting opinion:

Common sense and justice dictate that a citizen accused of a crime should have the fullest hearing possible, plus the opportunity to present every reasonable defense. Only an unenlightened jurisprudence condemns an individual without according him those rights. Such a denial is especially oppressive where a full hearing might disclose that the administrative action underlying the prosecution is the product of excess wartime emotions. Experience demonstrates that in time of war individual liberties cannot always be entrusted safely to uncontrolled administrative discretion.
