= Johnson v. Southern Pacific Co. =

- Supreme Court of the United States

Argued October 31, 1904 Decided December 19, 1904
- Full case name: Johnson v. Southern Pacific Co.
- Citations: 196 U.S. 1 (more) 25 S. Ct. 158; 49 L. Ed. 363

Case history
- Prior: 117 F. 462 (8th Cir. 1902)

Court membership
- Chief Justice Melville Fuller Associate Justices John M. Harlan · David J. Brewer; Henry B. Brown · Edward D. White; Rufus W. Peckham · Joseph McKenna; Oliver W. Holmes Jr. · William R. Day

Case opinion
- Majority: Fuller, joined by unanimous

Laws applied
- Railroad Safety Appliance Act

Johnson v. Southern Pacific Co., 196 U.S. 1 (1904), was a case before the United States Supreme Court. It interpreted the words "any car" in the Railroad Safety Appliance Act, prohibiting common carriers moving interstate commerce from using any car that was not equipped with automatic couplers. In doing so, it overturned the Eighth Circuit in Johnson v. Southern P. Co., 117 F. 462 (8th Cir. 1902)

== Background ==
On August 5, 1900, Johnson was acting as head brakeman on a freight train of the Southern Pacific Company, which was making its regular trip between San Francisco; California; and Ogden, Utah. On reaching the town of Promontory, Utah, Johnson was directed to uncouple the engine from the train and couple it to a dining car belonging to the company that was standing on a side track for the purpose of turning the car around preparatory to its being picked up and put on the next westbound passenger train. The engine and the dining car were equipped, respectively, with the Janney coupler and the Miller hook, so called, which would not couple together automatically by impact, and it was, therefore, necessary for Johnson, and he was ordered to go between the engine and the dining car to accomplish the coupling. In so doing, Johnson's hand was caught between the engine bumper and the dining car bumper and crushed, which necessitated amputation of the hand above the wrist.

== Lower courts ==
The brakeman brought his action in a state district court (District Court of the First Judicial District of Utah). The case was subsequently removed to a federal trial court (Circuit Court of the United States for the District of Utah) on the ground of diversity of citizenship.

On trial, after plaintiff had rested its case, the Court granted defendant's motion to instruct the jury to find in its favor (directed verdict).

Plaintiff carried the case to the Circuit Court of Appeals for the Eighth Circuit and the judgment was affirmed. 117 Fed. Rep. 462.

The case was brought to the Supreme Court on certiorari and also on writ of error.

Appellant claimed that he was relieved of an assumption of risk under common law rules. The case involved the application of a congressional act in respect of automatic couplers, the primary question being whether locomotives were required to be equipped with couplers. Another issue was that the dining car was empty and was not used in moving interstate traffic.

== Opinion of the court ==
The Supreme Court reversed the judgment and held that whether cars were empty or loaded, the danger to employees was the same. Thus, the dining car was regularly used in the movement of interstate traffic and so was within the purview of the law. The car's locomotive should have been equipped with couplers because it was obligated by law. Since that particular car was regularly used in the movement of interstate traffic, it was irrelevant that the car was empty at the time of appellant's injuries.

1. Locomotives are embraced by the words "any car" in the act of March 2, 1893 (27 Stat. at L. 531, chap. 196, U. S. Comp. Stat. 1901, p. 3174), 2, prohibiting common carriers from using any car in moving interstate commerce not equipped with automatic couplers, although locomotives were, elsewhere in the statute, in terms required to be equipped with power driving-wheel brakes.

2. The doctrine that statutes in derogation of the common law are to be construed strictly does not demand that the act of March 2, 1893 (27 Stat. at L. 531, chap. 196, U. S. Comp. Stat. 1901, p. 3174), compelling interstate carriers to adopt automatic couplers, in which there is an undoubted intention to make some change in the existing law, should be so construed as to defeat the obvious object of Congress.

3. The rule that penal statutes are to be construed strictly does not permit such a construction as defeats the obvious intention of the legislature.

4. The equipment of a locomotive and a dining car with automatic couplers, but of such different types as not to couple with each other automatically, does not satisfy the provision of the act of March 2, 1893 (27 Stat. at L. 531, chap. 196, U. S. Comp. Stat. 1901, p. 3174), 2, prohibiting common carriers from using any car in moving interstate commerce not equipped with couplers coupling automatically by impact, and which can be uncoupled without the necessity of men going between the ends of the cars.

5. Automatic couplers which will both couple and can be uncoupled without the necessity of men going between the cars are meant by the provision of the act of March 2, 1893 (27 Stat. at L. 531, chap. 196, U. S. Comp. Stat. 1901, p. 3174), 2, prohibiting common carriers from using any car in moving interstate commerce not equipped with "couplers coupling automatically by impact, and which can be uncoupled without the necessity of men going between the ends of the cars."

6. A dining car in constant use is, while waiting for the train to be made up for its next interstate trip, "used in moving interstate traffic" within the meaning of the act of March 2, 1893 (27 Stat. at L. 531, chap. 196, U. S. Comp. Stat. 1901, p. 3174), 2, requiring common carriers to equip with automatic couplers any car so used.

== See also ==
- Santa Clara County v. Southern Pacific Railroad: U.S. Supreme Court case involving Southern Pacific's successful challenge to local tax assessments.
- Southern Pacific Company v. Arizona: U.S. Supreme Court case involving Southern Pacific's successful challenge to a state safety law
- List of United States Supreme Court cases, volume 196
