= Robert Lee Hale =

American lawyer and economist

Robert Lee Hale (1884–1969) was an American lawyer and economist. He earned an economics degree at Harvard University, and then worked at Columbia Law School. He is known as a legal realist, and his work focused particularly on the distributive impact of legal rules.

== Publications ==
- "Rate Making and the Revision of the Property Concept" (1922) 22 Columbia Law Review 209
- "Coercion and Distribution in a Supposedly Non-Coercive State" (1923) 38 Political Science Quarterly
- "Economic Theory and the Statesman" in R G Tugwell (ed.), The Trend of Economics (New York, Knopf, 1924) 189 at 194–5
- "Economics and Law" in W F Ogburn & A Goldenweiser (eds.), The Social Sciences and their Interrelations (London, Allen & Unwin, 1927) 131 at 132–3
- "Force and the State: A Comparison of 'Political' and 'Economic' Compulsion" (1935) 35 Columbia Law Review
- "Prima Facie Torts, Combination, and Non-Feasance" (1946) 46 Columbia Law Review
- "Bargaining, Duress and Economic Liberty." (1943) 43 Columbia Law Review
- Freedom Through Law: Public Control of Private Governing Power (1952)

== See also ==
- Legal realism
- Smyth v Ames (1898) 169 US 466
