= Wabash, St. Louis & Pacific Railway Co. v. Illinois =

Wabash, St. Louis & Pacific Railway Company v. Illinois
- Supreme Court of the United States

Argued April 14–15, 1886 Decided October 25, 1886
- Full case name: Wabash, St. L. & P. Ry. Co. v. People of State of Illinois
- Citations: 118 U.S. 557 (more) 7 S. Ct. 4; 30 L. Ed. 244

Holding
- The Court held that Illinois had violated the Commerce Clause by placing a direct burden on interstate commerce. Under the Commerce Clause only Congress had the power to do so and states could only place indirect burdens on commerce.

Court membership
- Chief Justice Morrison Waite Associate Justices Samuel F. Miller · Stephen J. Field; Joseph P. Bradley · John M. Harlan; William B. Woods · Stanley Matthews; Horace Gray · Samuel Blatchford

Case opinions
- Majority: Miller, joined by Field, Harlan, Woods, Matthews, Blatchford
- Dissent: Bradley, joined by Waite, Gray

Laws applied
- U.S. Const. amend. XIV
- This case overturned a previous ruling or rulings
- Munn v. Illinois (1877)

Wabash, St. Louis & Pacific Railway Company v. Illinois, 118 U.S. 557 (1886), also known as the Wabash Case, was a Supreme Court decision that severely limited the rights of states to control or impede interstate commerce. It led to the creation of the Interstate Commerce Commission.

== The court ==
The majority's opinion was written by Justice Samuel Miller; joining him were associate justices Stephen Field, John Harlan, William Woods, Stanley Matthews, and Samuel Blatchford. Dissenting were Chief Justice Morrison Waite and associate justices Joseph Bradley and Horace Gray.

== The case ==
The case was argued on April 14, 1886 - April 15, 1886 and was decided on October 25, 1886, by vote of 6 to 3. Associate Justice Miller wrote for the Court with Associate Justices Field, Harlan, Woods, Matthews, and Blatchford concurring; Associate Justices Bradley and Gray, along with Chief Justice Waite, dissented.

In Wabash, "direct" burdens on interstate commerce were not permitted by the Export Tax Clause of the Constitution (Article I, Section 9); however, those "indirect" burdens were permitted under the Commerce Clause. This was a standard enacted in Cooley v. Board of Wardens (1852).

== Effects of decision ==
- The Wabash decision led to the creation in 1887 of the first modern regulatory agency, the Interstate Commerce Commission.
- It clarified the "direct" v. "indirect" test (though this doctrine was abandoned in the 1930s).
- It was one of the first instances in government assuming responsibility for economic affairs that had previously been delegated to the states.

== See also ==
- Munn v. Illinois
- List of United States Supreme Court cases, volume 118
