= Granger Laws =

US laws regulating fare prices

The Granger Laws were a series of laws passed in several midwestern states of the United States, namely Minnesota, Iowa, Wisconsin, and Illinois, in the late 1860s and early 1870s. The Granger Laws were promoted primarily by a group of farmers known as The National Grange of the Order of Patrons of Husbandry. The main goal of the Granger was to regulate rising fare prices of railroad and grain elevator companies after the American Civil War. The laws, which upset major railroad companies, were a topic of much debate at the time and ended up leading to several important court cases, such as Munn v. Illinois and Wabash v. Illinois.

The railroads targeted by these laws, such as the Rock Island, Chicago & North Western, and the Milwaukee Road, are sometimes called "granger railroads."

== The effects of the Granger Laws ==
Certain aspects of the Granger Laws varied from state to state, but all of the involved states shared the same intent: to make pricing of railroad rates more favorable to farmers, small rural farmers in particular, in the states. This common aspiration was a result of the laws being promoted heavily in state politics by the National Grange of the Patrons of Husbandry (Grange). The Grange was an organization of farmers that stretched throughout the Midwestern United States and filtered into the Southern United States. Despite the highest proportion of its members being in Kansas and Nebraska, the Grange were most effective in Illinois, Wisconsin, Iowa, and Minnesota, where the Granger laws were eventually passed. The two Granger laws that became the best-known were those passed in Illinois and Wisconsin.

== The Illinois Granger Laws ==
The Illinois granger laws focused primarily on eliminating the discrimination between long- and short-haul rates of railroads and regulating the maximum price charged by grain storage facilities. The farmers of the Illinois Grange wanted this because smaller rural farmers who tended to ship more locally were being charged such high rates that they were having a difficult time staying in business and making a profit. The Illinois granger laws led to several important court cases, two of which were Munn v. Illinois and the Wabash Case.

=== Munn v. Illinois ===
In 1877, a grain storage company, Munn and Scott, was found guilty for violating the Illinois Granger law, which set a maximum grain storage charge. Following an appeal to the Illinois Supreme Court, which resulted in the affirmation of the law, the case was taken to the U.S. Supreme Court. The U.S. Supreme Court then ruled that because the company was in a business that affected the public interest, the government could in fact regulate the company. This ruling also applied to railroads, as railroad companies were deemed private companies serving the public interest. Thus the Munn v. Illinois case set the precedent that regulating both grain elevator rates and railroad rates was within the bounds of the Constitution.

=== Wabash v. Illinois ===
Wabash, St. Louis & Pacific Railway Co. v. Illinois involved a railroad company, Wabash, St. Louis, and Pacific Railway Company, serving the upper Midwest and the state of Illinois, which in 1886 resulted in the overturning of Munn v. Illinois. The U.S. Supreme Court ruled in 1886 that Illinois’ granger laws were unconstitutional because they attempted to control interstate commerce, which had been deemed a responsibility of the federal government by Gibbons v. Ogden (1824). Following the Wabash Case, Congress passed the Interstate Commerce Act of 1887, the first federal regulation of business in the United States. This act forced railroad companies to publish their rates with the government and banned railroads from charging different rates for short and long hauls. This 1887 act also created the Interstate Commerce Commission, which regulated the rates of railroads and ensured the rates remained “reasonable and just”.

== Wisconsin’s Potter Law ==
Wisconsin's granger laws were among, if not the, most severe of the four states. While other states such as Illinois implemented a system of price regulation by administrative bodies, Wisconsin adopted a strict legislative regulation policy on rate fixing. The Potter Law brought about this system of price fixing. The rates at which Wisconsin fixed the prices yielded little to no profits for the railroad companies. The fixing of rates led to many negative economic effects for the state. In the second year under the Potter Law, no Wisconsin railroad paid a dividend and only four railroads paid interest on their bonds. This led to a complete halt in railroad construction in the state, as the companies did not believe they would make a profit if they built more lines. In 1876, despite still being within constitutional bounds, the state of Wisconsin repealed the law in attempts to spur economic growth brought about by railroad construction.

Today Wisconsin's railways are administered under the Office of the Commissioner of Railroads.
