= Southern Pacific Co. v. Arizona =

Southern Pacific Company v. Arizona
- Supreme Court of the United States

Argued March 26, 1945 Decided June 18, 1945
- Full case name: Southern Pacific Company v. Arizona ex rel. Sullivan, Attorney General
- Citations: 325 U.S. 761 (more) 65 S. Ct. 1515; 89 L. Ed. 1915; 1945 U.S. LEXIS 2816

Case history
- Prior: Appeal from a judgment upholding the constitutionality of the Arizona Train Limit Law. 61 Ariz. 66, 145 P.2d 530

Holding
- Arizona's state interest in maintaining a state statute that limited trains to either 14 passenger cars or 70 freight cars is outweighed by the interest of the nation in an adequate, economical and efficient railway transportation service.

Court membership
- Chief Justice Harlan F. Stone Associate Justices Owen Roberts · Hugo Black; Stanley F. Reed · Felix Frankfurter; William O. Douglas · Frank Murphy; Robert H. Jackson · Wiley B. Rutledge

Case opinions
- Majority: Stone, joined by Roberts, Reed, Frankfurter, Murphy, Jackson
- Concurrence: Rutledge
- Dissent: Black
- Dissent: Douglas

Laws applied
- The Arizona Train Limit Law of May 16, 1912, Arizona Code Ann., 1939, § 69-119

Southern Pacific Company v. Arizona, 325 U.S. 761 (1945), was a United States Supreme Court case in which the Court held that the Arizona Train Limit Law of 1912, which prohibited passenger trains with more than fourteen cars and prohibited freight trains with more than seventy cars, placed an unconstitutional burden on interstate commerce. The Court held that the law imposed a burden far greater than necessary to achieve Arizona's legitimate interest in lowering the rate of train accidents. This case is part of the Court's so-called negative commerce clause jurisprudence.

== Decision ==
At issue was whether Arizona as a sovereign state could enact and enforce the Train Limit Law without running afoul of the Commerce Clause of the United States Constitution. Under the negative commerce clause, even when Congress has not yet acted, a state may not pass a law that either wrongly discriminates against interstate commerce or unduly burdens interstate commerce. State laws that discriminate against interstate commerce in favor of intrastate commerce are per se invalid if enacted for the purpose of economic protectionism, but are valid if enacted for a legitimate health and safety reason so long as no reasonable alternative nondiscriminatory means exists to accomplish that health and safety goal. State laws that do not discriminate against interstate commerce but that burden interstate commerce are subject to a balancing test, later crystallized by the Court in Pike v. Bruce Church, wherein the state law is invalid if its burden on interstate commerce is not outweighed by the legitimate health and safety benefits that derive from the law.

Writing for the majority, Chief Justice Stone held that the Train Limit Law imposed a great burden on interstate commerce, principally because nearly all the freight and passenger rail traffic in Arizona was interstate traffic, meaning that even trains operating outside Arizona had to comply with the Train Limit Law. As a result, 30% more trains than previously used were needed because of the limitation on the number of trains per car, at an added cost of $1,000,000 per year before adjustment for inflation. The Court held that there was insufficient benefit to Arizona's legitimate health and safety interests to justify so great a burden on interstate commerce: the Train Limit Law had ostensibly been passed to decrease the rate of rail accidents that "result from the greater length of trains," but the court noted that if anything the result of the law might have been to increase accidents "resulting from the larger number of trains." Accordingly, the Train Limit Law was not reasonably related to the state's legitimate interest in train safety let alone sufficiently beneficial towards achieving that end that it would justify the burden it imposed on interstate commerce.

== Dissenting Opinions ==
Justice Black dissented, noting that at worst the Arizona law was "unwise" and that legislatures rather than the Supreme Court should bear responsibility for repealing unwise laws. Justice Douglas also dissented, stating that the negative commerce clause doctrine should extend only to state laws that discriminate against interstate commerce rather than also to state laws that might burden interstate commerce.

== See also ==
- Johnson v. Southern Pacific Co.: U.S. Supreme Court case involving Southern Pacific's unsuccessful challenge to a federal safety law
- Santa Clara County v. Southern Pacific Railroad: U.S. Supreme Court case involving Southern Pacific's successful challenge to local tax assessments.
