= List of United States Supreme Court cases, volume 118 =

Supreme Court of the United States
- Interactive map of Supreme Court of the United States
- 38°53′26″N 77°00′16″W
- Established: March 4, 1789; 236 years ago
- Location: Washington, D.C.
- Coordinates: 38°53′26″N 77°00′16″W
- Composition method: Presidential nomination with Senate confirmation
- Authorised by: Constitution of the United States, Art. III, § 1
- Judge term length: life tenure, subject to impeachment and removal
- Number of positions: 9 (by statute)
- Website: supremecourt.gov

This is a list of cases reported in volume 118 of United States Reports, decided by the Supreme Court of the United States in 1886.

== Justices of the Supreme Court at the time of volume 118 U.S. ==
The Supreme Court is established by Article III, Section 1 of the Constitution of the United States, which says: "The judicial Power of the United States, shall be vested in one supreme Court . . .". The size of the Court is not specified; the Constitution leaves it to Congress to set the number of justices. Under the Judiciary Act of 1789 Congress originally fixed the number of justices at six (one chief justice and five associate justices). Since 1789 Congress has varied the size of the Court from six to seven, nine, ten, and back to nine justices (always including one chief justice).

When the cases in volume 118 U.S. were decided the Court comprised the following nine members:

| Portrait | Justice | Office | Home State | Succeeded | Date confirmed by the Senate (Vote) | Tenure on Supreme Court |
|---|---|---|---|---|---|---|
| | Morrison Waite | Chief Justice | Ohio | Salmon P. Chase | January 21, 1874 (63–0) | March 4, 1874 – March 23, 1888 (Died) |
| | Samuel Freeman Miller | Associate Justice | Iowa | Peter Vivian Daniel | July 16, 1862 (Acclamation) | July 21, 1862 – October 13, 1890 (Died) |
| | Stephen Johnson Field | Associate Justice | California | newly created seat | March 10, 1863 (Acclamation) | May 10, 1863 – December 1, 1897 (Retired) |
| | Joseph P. Bradley | Associate Justice | New Jersey | newly created seat | March 21, 1870 (46–9) | March 23, 1870 – January 22, 1892 (Died) |
| | John Marshall Harlan | Associate Justice | Kentucky | David Davis | November 29, 1877 (Acclamation) | December 10, 1877 – October 14, 1911 (Died) |
| | William Burnham Woods | Associate Justice | Georgia | William Strong | December 21, 1880 (39–8) | January 5, 1881 – May 14, 1887 (Died) |
| | Stanley Matthews | Associate Justice | Ohio | Noah Haynes Swayne | May 12, 1881 (24–23) | May 17, 1881 – March 22, 1889 (Died) |
| | Horace Gray | Associate Justice | Massachusetts | Nathan Clifford | December 20, 1881 (51–5) | January 9, 1882 – September 15, 1902 (Died) |
| | Samuel Blatchford | Associate Justice | New York | Ward Hunt | March 22, 1882 (Acclamation) | April 3, 1882 – July 7, 1893 (Died) |

== Notable Cases in 118 U.S. ==
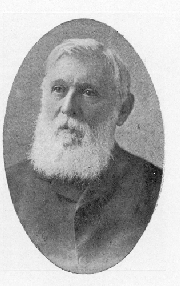
Bancroft Davis, the Reporter of Decisions who wrote the headnote in Santa Clara County.

=== Yick Wo v. Hopkins ===
Yick Wo v. Hopkins, 356 (1886), was the first case in which the Supreme Court held that a law, race-neutral on its face but administered in a prejudicial manner, is an infringement of the Equal Protection Clause of the Fourteenth Amendment. By the 1950s, the Warren Court used the principle established in Yick Wo to strike down several attempts by states and municipalities in the Deep South to limit the political rights of blacks. Yick Wo has been cited in more than 150 Supreme Court cases since it was decided.

=== Santa Clara County v. Southern Pacific R.R. Co. ===
Santa Clara County v. Southern Pacific R.R. Co., 394 (1886), is a corporate law case concerning taxation of railroad properties. The case is most notable for a headnote written by the Supreme Court's Reporter of Decisions, Bancroft Davis, stating that the Equal Protection Clause of the Fourteenth Amendment grants constitutional protections to corporations as it does to natural persons, although the text of the decision itself does not establish this principle.

=== Wabash, St. Louis & Pacific Railway Co. v. Illinois ===
In Wabash, St. Louis & Pacific Railway Co. v. Illinois, 557 (1886), also known as the Wabash Case, the Supreme Court severely limited the rights of states to control or impede interstate commerce. The decision led to the creation of the federal Interstate Commerce Commission, the first modern regulatory agency in the United States.

== Citation style ==
Under the Judiciary Act of 1789 the federal court structure at the time comprised District Courts, which had general trial jurisdiction; Circuit Courts, which had mixed trial and appellate (from the US District Courts) jurisdiction; and the United States Supreme Court, which had appellate jurisdiction over the federal District and Circuit courts—and for certain issues over state courts. The Supreme Court also had limited original jurisdiction (i.e., in which cases could be filed directly with the Supreme Court without first having been heard by a lower federal or state court). There were one or more federal District Courts and/or Circuit Courts in each state, territory, or other geographical region.

Bluebook citation style is used for case names, citations, and jurisdictions.

- "C.C.D." = United States Circuit Court for the District of . . .
  - e.g.,"C.C.D.N.J." = United States Circuit Court for the District of New Jersey
- "D." = United States District Court for the District of . . .
  - e.g.,"D. Mass." = United States District Court for the District of Massachusetts
- "E." = Eastern; "M." = Middle; "N." = Northern; "S." = Southern; "W." = Western
  - e.g.,"C.C.S.D.N.Y." = United States Circuit Court for the Southern District of New York
  - e.g.,"M.D. Ala." = United States District Court for the Middle District of Alabama
- "Ct. Cl." = United States Court of Claims
- The abbreviation of a state's name alone indicates the highest appellate court in that state's judiciary at the time.
  - e.g.,"Pa." = Supreme Court of Pennsylvania
  - e.g.,"Me." = Supreme Judicial Court of Maine

== List of cases in volume 118 U.S. ==
| Case Name | Page and year | Opinion of the Court | Concurring opinion(s) | Dissenting opinion(s) | Lower Court | Disposition |
|---|---|---|---|---|---|---|
| Emerson v. Senter and Company | 3 (1886) | Harlan | None | None | C.C.E.D. Ark. | reversed |
| Dobson v. Dornan | 10 (1886) | Blatchford | Field | None | C.C.E.D. Pa. | reversed |
| Johnston v. District of Columbia | 19 (1886) | Gray | None | None | Sup. Ct. D.C. | affirmed |
| United States Rifle and Cartridge Company v. Whitney Arms Company | 22 (1886) | Gray | None | None | C.C.D. Conn. | affirmed |
| Keyes v. Grant | 25 (1886) | Matthews | None | None | C.C.D. Colo. | reversed |
| South Boston Iron Company v. United States | 37 (1886) | Waite | None | None | Ct. Cl. | affirmed |
| Oakley v. Goodnow | 43 (1886) | Waite | None | None | Iowa | affirmed |
| Benjamin's Heirs v. Dubois | 46 (1886) | Waite | None | None | Sup. Ct. D.C. | dismissed |
| Mexican National Construction Company v. Reusens | 49 (1886) | Waite | None | None | C.C.S.D.N.Y. | security denied |
| Cambria Iron Company v. Ashburn | 54 (1886) | Waite | None | None | C.C.S.D. Ohio | affirmed |
| Cashman v. Amador and Sacramento Canal Company | 58 (1886) | Waite | None | None | C.C.D. Cal. | affirmed |
| Hart v. United States | 62 (1886) | Blatchford | None | None | Ct. Cl. | affirmed |
| Cape Girardeau County v. United States | 68 (1886) | Harlan | None | None | C.C.E.D. Mo. | affirmed |
| Cadman v. Peter | 73 (1886) | Blatchford | None | None | C.C.W.D. Mich. | affirmed |
| United States v. Landram | 81 (1886) | Woods | None | None | Ct. Cl. | affirmed |
| United States v. Wilson | 86 (1886) | Matthews | None | None | C.C.M.D. Tenn. | affirmed |
| Spraigue, Soullee and Company v. Thompson | 90 (1886) | Matthews | None | None | Ga. | reversed |
| Clay v. Freeman | 97 (1886) | Bradley | None | None | C.C.N.D. Miss. | reversed |
| Southern Pacific Company v. California | 109 (1886) | Waite | None | None | Cal. | reversed |
| Ex parte Lothrop | 113 (1886) | Waite | None | None | Terr. Ariz. County Ct. | habeas corpus denied |
| United States v. Nashville, Chattanooga and St. Louis Railway Company | 120 (1886) | Gray | None | None | C.C.M.D. Tenn. | reversed |
| Conley v. Nailor | 127 (1886) | Woods | None | None | Sup. Ct. D.C. | reversed |
| New Orleans Board of Liquidation v. Hart | 136 (1886) | Field | None | None | C.C.E.D. La. | affirmed |
| Sun Mutual Insurance Company v. United States ex rel. Hart | 147 (1886) | per curiam | None | None | not indicated | affirmed |
| Hopper v. Town of Covington | 148 (1886) | Gray | None | None | C.C.D. Ind. | affirmed |
| Paine v. Central Vermont Railway | 152 (1886) | Gray | None | None | C.C.D. Vt. | affirmed |
| Graham v. New York and New England Railroad Company | 161 (1886) | Blatchford | None | None | C.C.D. Mass. | affirmed |
| Gardner v. Herz | 180 (1886) | Blatchford | None | None | C.C.S.D.N.Y. | affirmed |
| Arrowsmith v. Harmoning | 194 (1886) | Waite | None | None | Ohio | affirmed |
| Iron Silver Mining Company v. Elgin Mining and Smelting Company | 196 (1886) | Field | None | Waite | C.C.D. Colo. | affirmed |
| Hunt v. Oliver | 211 (1886) | Woods | None | None | C.C.E.D. Mich. | reversed |
| Hartranft v. Du Pont | 223 (1886) | Woods | None | Bradley | C.C.E.D. Pa. | reversed |
| Johnson v. Wilkins | 228 (1886) | Waite | None | None | C.C.N.D. Fla. | reinstatement denied |
| Wells v. Wilkins | 230 (1886) | Waite | None | None | C.C.N.D. Fla. | reinstatement denied |
| Bohanan v. Nebraska | 231 (1886) | Waite | None | None | Neb. | dismissal denied |
| United States v. Hailey | 233 (1886) | Waite | None | None | Sup. Ct. Terr. Idaho | dismissed |
| United States v. Central Pacific Railroad Company | 235 (1886) | Woods | None | None | Ct. Cl. | affirmed |
| Evans v. Pike | 241 (1886) | Bradley | None | None | C.C.E.D. La. | affirmed |
| Libby v. Clark | 250 (1886) | Miller | None | None | Kan. | affirmed |
| Salt Lake City v. Hollister | 256 (1886) | Miller | None | None | Sup. Ct. Terr. Utah | affirmed |
| Plymouth Gold Mining Company v. Amador and Sacramento Canal Company | 264 (1886) | Waite | None | None | C.C.D. Cal. | affirmed |
| Mullan v. United States | 271 (1886) | Waite | None | None | C.C.D. Cal. | affirmed |
| Carson v. Hyatt | 279 (1886) | Waite | None | None | S.C. | reversed |
| Pennsylvania Railroad Company v. St. Louis, Alton and Terre Haute Railroad Company | 290 (1886) | Miller | None | Bradley | C.C.D. Ind. | reversed |
| Loring v. Palmer | 321 (1886) | Waite | None | None | C.C.E.D. Mich. | affirmed |
| Snow v. United States | 346 (1886) | Blatchford | None | None | Sup. Ct. Terr. Utah | dismissed |
| Cannon v. United States | 355 (1886) | Blatchford | None | None | Sup. Ct. Terr. Utah | dismissed |
| Yick Wo v. Hopkins | 356 (1886) | Matthews | None | None | multiple | reversed |
| United States v. Kagama | 375 (1886) | Miller | None | None | C.C.D. Cal. | certification |
| Francis v. Flinn | 385 (1886) | Field | None | None | C.C.E.D. La. | reversed |
| United States v. Langston | 389 (1886) | Harlan | None | None | Ct. Cl. | affirmed |
| Santa Clara County v. Southern Pacific Railroad Company | 394 (1886) | Harlan | None | None | C.C.D. Cal. | affirmed |
| San Bernardino County v. Southern Pacific Railroad Company | 417 (1886) | Harlan | Field | None | C.C.D. Cal. | affirmed |
| Norton v. Shelby County | 425 (1886) | Field | None | None | C.C.W.D. Tenn. | affirmed |
| Morgan's Steamship Company v. Louisiana Board of Health | 455 (1886) | Miller | None | None | La. | affirmed |
| The City of Norwich | 468 (1886) | Bradley | None | Matthews | C.C.E.D.N.Y. | affirmed |
| The Scotland | 507 (1886) | Bradley | None | Matthews | C.C.E.D.N.Y. | affirmed |
| The Great Western | 520 (1886) | Bradley | None | Matthews | C.C.E.D.N.Y. | affirmed |
| Vicksburg and Meridian Railroad Company v. Putnam | 545 (1886) | Gray | None | None | C.C.N.D. Ga. | reversed |
| Wabash, St. Louis and Pacific Railway Company v. Illinois | 557 (1886) | Miller | None | Bradley | Ill. | reversed |
| Little v. Giles | 596 (1886) | Bradley | None | None | C.C.D. Neb. | reversed |
| New York Elevated Railway Company v. Fifth National Bank | 608 (1886) | Waite | None | None | C.C.S.D.N.Y. | dismissal denied |
| Ex parte Phenix Insurance Company | 610 (1886) | Blatchford | None | None | E.D. Wis. | prohibition granted |
| Jacksonville, Pensacola and Mobile Railroad Company v. United States | 626 (1886) | Field | None | None | Ct. Cl. | affirmed |
| Pennsylvania Railroad Company v. St. Louis, Alton and Terre Haute Railroad Company | 630 (1886) | Miller | None | None | C.C.D. Ind. | rehearing denied |
| Delano v. Butler | 634 (1886) | Matthews | None | None | C.C.D. Mass. | affirmed |
| Whitney v. Butler | 655 (1886) | Harlan | None | None | C.C.D. Mass. | reversed |
| Harkness v. Russell and Company | 663 (1886) | Bradley | None | None | Sup. Ct. Terr. Utah | affirmed |
| Kansas City, Lawrence and South Kansas Railroad Company v. Brewster | 682 (1886) | Miller | None | None | C.C.D. Ark. | reversed |
