= List of United States Supreme Court cases, volume 320 =

This is a list of all the United States Supreme Court cases from volume 320 of the United States Reports:

Case name	Citation	Date decided
Marconi Wireless Telegraph Company v. United States	320 U.S. 1	1943
Hirabayashi v. United States	320 U.S. 81	1943
Yasui v. United States	320 U.S. 115	1943
Schneiderman v. United States	320 U.S. 118	1943
Ex parte Abernathy	320 U.S. 219	1943
United States ex rel. McCann v. Adams	320 U.S. 220	1943
Hunter Company v. McHugh	320 U.S. 222	1943
Meredith v. City of Winter Haven	320 U.S. 228	1943
Bell v. Preferred Life Assurance Society	320 U.S. 238	1943
Carter v. Kubler	320 U.S. 243	1943
Consumers Import Company v. Kabushiki	320 U.S. 249	1943
Merchants' National Bank v. IRS	320 U.S. 256	1943
Roberts v. United States	320 U.S. 264	1943
United States v. Dotterweich	320 U.S. 277	1943
Cafeteria Employees Union, Local 302 v. Angelos	320 U.S. 293	1943
Switchmen's Union of North America v. National Mediation Board	320 U.S. 297	1943
General Committee of Adjustment of Brotherhood of Locomotive Engineers for Missouri-Kansas-Texas Railroad v. Missouri-Kansas-Texas Railroad Company	320 U.S. 323	1943
General Committee of Adjustment of Brotherhood of Locomotive Engineers for Pacific Lines of Southern Pacific Company v. Southern Pacific Company	320 U.S. 338	1943
Securities and Exchange Commission v. C.M. Joiner Leasing Corporation	320 U.S. 344	1943
Midstate Horticultural Company, Inc. v. Pennsylvania Railroad Company	320 U.S. 356	1943
Interstate Commerce Commission v. Hoboken Manufacturers' Railroad Company	320 U.S. 368	1943
Colorado v. Kansas	320 U.S. 383	1943
Crescent Express Lines, Inc. v. United States	320 U.S. 401	1943
Estate of Rogers v. Commissioner of Internal Revenue	320 U.S. 410	1943
Commissioner of Internal Revenue v. Gooch Milling & Elevator Company	320 U.S. 418	1943
Colgate-Palmolive-Peet Company v. United States	320 U.S. 422	1943
Magnolia Petroleum Company v. Hunt	320 U.S. 430	1943
Atlantic Refining Company v. Moller	320 U.S. 462	1943
Commissioner of Internal Revenue v. Heininger	320 U.S. 467	1943
Brady v. Southern Railway Company	320 U.S. 476	1943
Dobson v. Commissioner of Internal Revenue	320 U.S. 489	1943
Illinois Steel Company v. Baltimore and Ohio Railroad Company	320 U.S. 508	1944
Dixie Pine Products Company v. Commissioner of Internal Revenue	320 U.S. 516	1944
Hill v. Hawes	320 U.S. 520	1944
United States v. Gaskin	320 U.S. 527	1944
United States v. Hark	320 U.S. 531	1944
Walton v. Southern Package Corporation	320 U.S. 540	1944
United States v. Laudani	320 U.S. 543	1944
Falbo v. United States	320 U.S. 549	1944
United States v. Myers	320 U.S. 561	1944
California v. United States	320 U.S. 577	1944
Federal Power Commission v. Hope Natural Gas Company	320 U.S. 591	1944
Mercoid Corp. v. Mid-Continent Inv. Co.	320 U.S. 661	1944
Mercoid Corp. v. Minneapolis-Honeywell Regulator Co.	320 U.S. 680	1944
City of Yonkers v. United States	320 U.S. 685	1944
District of Columbia v. Pace	320 U.S. 698	1944
