= James C. H. Bonbright =

American diplomat (1903-1993)

James Cowles Hart Bonbright (January 19, 1903 – February 10, 1993) was a career foreign service officer who served as the US Ambassador to Portugal (February 18, 1955 – November 27, 1958) and Sweden (January 9, 1959 – March 20, 1961).

Raised by his parents in Rochester, New York, he was educated at St. Paul's School in Concord, New Hampshire. When he graduated in 1921, he continued his education at Harvard University.

On April 9, 1933, he married Helen Sybil Rhodes, daughter of the Canadian Minister of Finance.
