= Munn v. Illinois =

- Supreme Court of the United States

Argued January 15–18, 1876 Decided March 1, 1877
- Full case name: Munn v. State of Illinois
- Citations: 94 U.S. 113 (more) 4 Otto 113; 24 L. Ed. 77; 1876 U.S. LEXIS 1842

Holding
- The Fourteenth Amendment does not prevent a state from establishing regulatory costs for private businesses that affect the public interest.

Court membership
- Chief Justice Morrison Waite Associate Justices Nathan Clifford · Noah H. Swayne; Samuel F. Miller · David Davis; Stephen J. Field · William Strong; Joseph P. Bradley · Ward Hunt

Case opinions
- Majority: Waite, joined by Clifford, Swayne, Miller, Davis, Bradley, Hunt
- Dissent: Field, joined by Strong

Laws applied
- U.S. Const. amend. XIV
- Overruled by
- Wabash, St. Louis & Pacific Railway Company v. Illinois (1886)

Munn v. Illinois, 94 U.S. 113 (1877), was a United States Supreme Court case in which the Court upheld the power of state governments to regulate private industries that affected the public interest.

== Background ==
The concept of “publicness” had deep roots in American legal history as a justification for government regulation of businesses. These questions remained contested for more than half a century before the New Deal, as courts debated when a business became “affected with the public interest,” particularly where it had neither been regulated at common law nor received a special state franchise.

The case was developed because in 1871, the legislature of Illinois responded to pressure from the National Grange, an association of farmers, by setting maximum rates that private companies could charge for the storage and transport of agricultural products. The Chicago grain warehouse firm of Munn and Scott was found guilty of violating the law but appealed the conviction on the grounds that the law was an unconstitutional deprivation of property without due process of law that violated the Fourteenth Amendment. A state trial court and the Illinois State Supreme Court both ruled in favor of the State.

== Supreme Court ==
The Supreme Court decided the appeal in 1877. Chief Justice Morrison Waite spoke for the majority, which affirmed the constitutionality of state regulation extending to private industries that affect public interests. Because grain storage facilities were devoted to public use, their rates were subject to public regulation. He specified that any such regulation by the state government would not be in violation of the due process clause of the Fourteenth Amendment. Chief Justice Waite declared that even if Congress alone is granted control over interstate commerce, a state could take action in the public interest without impairing that federal control.

Justice Stephen Johnson Field dissented, arguing that although the state could regulate certain businesses under its police power, the property involved remained private and was protected by the Fourteenth Amendment. He maintained that allowing the legislature to set rates below what an owner could obtain by contract could partially destroy the value of the property.

== Later developments ==
Since 1877, the court has gone back and forth on the principle espoused in Munn v. Illinois that legislatures should set rates without judicial intervention. Munn established a standard under which businesses “clothed with the public interest” could be subject to such regulation. Munn was understood to permit price controls and other regulatory measures for public utilities, but it did not clearly define the scope of the public-interest standard. That uncertainty persisted for more than half a century, as courts and administrative agencies continued to grapple with the extent of permissible regulation.

The dissent by Field has proven influential in cases enumerating exceptions to Munn. The court never settled on criteria for what places a business into the category of business affected with the public interest, and much of the debate has been about that. The conflict between rate regulation and the protection of private property became central to subsequent utility-regulation cases. In Smyth v. Ames, the Supreme Court sought to reconcile the state's authority to regulate rates with the Fourteenth Amendment's protection of private property.

During the Lochner era, courts relied on this standard to extend the category of public utilities well beyond the traditional common-law categories. The case is commonly treated in casebooks as political context for the Lochner era. As a Harvard law professor, Felix Frankfurter—decades before joining the Supreme Court—described Munn as raising a fundamental question about the limits of legislative power. He identified two questions at the center of public-utility law: which businesses should be treated as public callings, and what degree of government control was appropriate once they were so classified. For antiregulatory judges, legislative authority extended only to industries that had been regulable at common law or to firms that had received a government privilege.

== See also ==
- Granger Laws
