= Tee-Hit-Ton v. United States =

- Supreme Court of the United States

Argued November 12, 1954 Decided February 7, 1955
- Full case name: Tee-Hit-Ton Indians v. United States
- Citations: 348 U.S. 272 (more) 75 S. Ct. 313; 99 L. Ed. 2d 314; 1955 U.S. LEXIS 1186

Case history
- Prior: Appeal from the United States Court of Claims, 120 F. Supp. 202 (1954)
- Subsequent: 132 F. Supp. 695 (1955)

Holding
- A Tribal nation's right of occupancy may be eliminated by the United States without any compensation.

Court membership
- Chief Justice Earl Warren Associate Justices Hugo Black · Stanley F. Reed; Felix Frankfurter · William O. Douglas; Harold H. Burton · Tom C. Clark; Sherman Minton

Case opinions
- Majority: Reed, joined by Black, Burton, Clark, Minton
- Dissent: Douglas, joined by Warren, Frankfurter

Tee-Hit-Ton v. United States, 348 U.S. 272 (1955), was a United States Supreme Court case in which the court held that a Tribal nation's right of occupancy (or "aboriginal title") may be eliminated by the United States without any compensation. Breaking with earlier cases, the court said the Natives' right of occupancy was lesser than a vested property right that the fee simple owner of the land would have within the American property system.

== Background ==
The Tee-Hit-Ton, a subgroup of the Tlingit people, brought an action in Court of Claims for compensation, under the Fifth Amendment to the United States Constitution, for timber taken from tribal-occupied lands in Alaska authorized by the Secretary of Agriculture. The tribe contended it had "full proprietary ownership" or at least a recognized right to unrestricted possession under the Organic Act for Alaska of 1884; the federal government asserted the opposite, and argued that if the tribe had any rights, they were to use the land at the government’s will.

== Procedural posture ==
The tribe first filed a suit in the United States Court of Claims, which found that the tribe was an identifiable group residing in Alaska; its interest in the lands prior to the purchase of Alaska was an "original Indian title." However, the Court of Claims also said that such a title was not enough to bring suit because the Congress did not recognize the tribe's legal rights of property ownership. The Court of Claims dismissed the tribe's suit.

== Decision ==
Justice Stanley Forman Reed, writing for the court, stated that Congress did not intend to grant the Tee-Hit-Ton any permanent rights to the occupied lands but had given them permission to occupy it. Reed cited Johnson v. McIntosh to say that, under the concept of conquest, any title to the land was extinguished when the "white man" came. Reed also said there was no prior case holding that the federal government was required to pay tribes before using the land or extinguishing the tribe's aboriginal title. Because there was no recognized title to the land, the court decided there was no right to compensation under the Fifth Amendment.

== Criticism ==
The interpretation of aboriginal title in this case has been criticized as ahistorical and incompatible with McIntosh and other cases. Although the McIntosh court's decision was not favorable to Native rights overall, the holding was that Natives could only transfer their right of occupancy in land to the United States, not to individuals. That is, McIntosh recognized that Natives had an a priori right of occupancy until such time as it transferred to the United States and became a fee simple interest within the American property system. Hence, in Mitchel v. United States, the Supreme Court recognized that the Natives' "right of occupancy is considered as sacred as the fee simple of the whites." Nevertheless, the Tee-Hit-Ton court falsely attributed to McIntosh the notion that the right of occupancy—aboriginal title itself—did not exist until the United States acquiesced to give it to Natives.

== See also ==
- List of United States Supreme Court cases, volume 348
