= Morrison Waite =

Chief Justice of the United States from 1874 to 1888

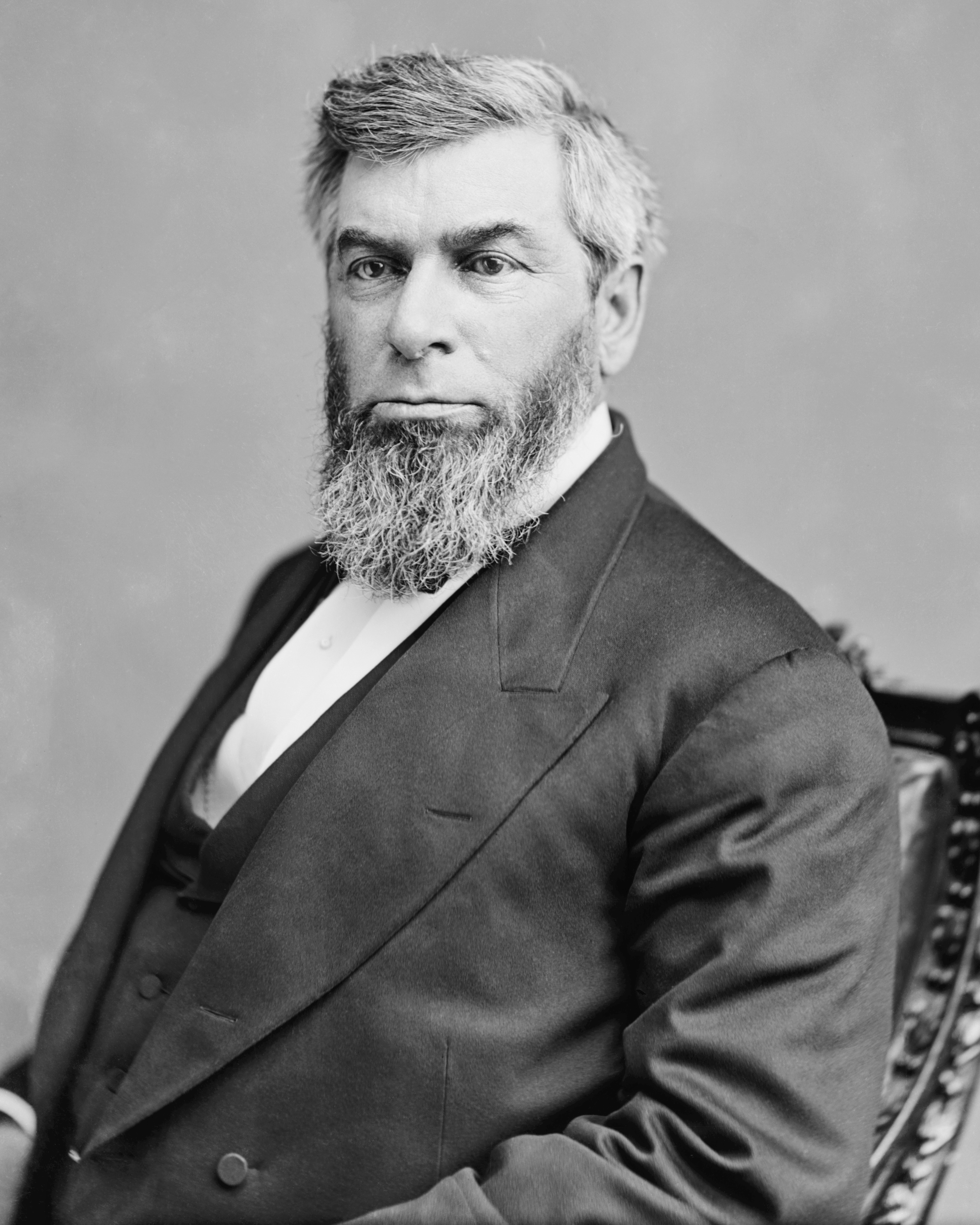
- Portrait by Mathew Brady, c. 1870—1880

7th Chief Justice of the United States
- In office March 4, 1874 – March 23, 1888
- Nominated by: Ulysses S. Grant
- Preceded by: Salmon P. Chase
- Succeeded by: Melville Fuller

Member of the Ohio House of Representatives from Lucas and Henry Counties
- In office 1849–1850
- Preceded by: Freeborn Potter
- Succeeded by: Samuel H. Steedman

Mayor of Maumee, Ohio
- In office March 31, 1846 – March 30, 1847
- Preceded by: Thomas Clark 2nd
- Succeeded by: John C. Allen

Personal details
- Born: Morrison Remick Waite; November 29, 1816 Lyme, Connecticut, U.S.
- Died: March 23, 1888 (aged 71) Washington, D.C., U.S.
- Resting place: Woodlawn Cemetery
- Party: Whig (before 1854); Republican (1854–1888)
- Spouse: Amelia Champlin Warner (m. 1840)
- Children: 4
- Education: Yale College (BA)

Morrison Remick "Mott" Waite (November 29, 1816 – March 23, 1888) was an American attorney, jurist, and politician from Ohio who served as the seventh chief justice of the United States from 1874 until his death in 1888. During his tenure, the Waite Court took a narrow interpretation of federal authority related to laws and amendments that were enacted during the Reconstruction Era to expand the rights of freedmen and protect them from attacks by white supremacist groups such as the Ku Klux Klan.

Born in Lyme, Connecticut, Waite established a legal practice in Toledo, Ohio, after graduating from Yale University. As a member of the Whig Party, Waite won election to the Ohio House of Representatives. An opponent of slavery, he helped establish the Ohio Republican Party. He served as a counsel in the Alabama Claims and presided over the 1873 Ohio constitutional convention.

After the May 1873 death of Chief Justice Salmon P. Chase, President Ulysses S. Grant underwent a prolonged search for Chase's successor. With the backing of Secretary of the Interior Columbus Delano, Grant nominated Waite in January 1874. The nomination of the relatively obscure Waite was poorly received by some prominent politicians, but the Senate unanimously confirmed Waite and he took office in March 1874. Despite some support for his nomination, he declined to run for president in the 1876 election, arguing that the Supreme Court should not serve as a mere stepping stone to higher office. He served on the court until his death of pneumonia in 1888.

Waite did not emerge as an important intellectual force on the Supreme Court, but he was well regarded as an administrator and conciliator. He sought a balance between federal and state power and joined with most other Justices in narrowly interpreting the Reconstruction Amendments. His majority opinion in Munn v. Illinois upheld government regulation of grain elevators and railroads and influenced constitutional understandings of government regulation. He also helped establish the legal concept of corporate personhood in the United States. However in the Civil Rights Cases he sided with a majority to strike down the Civil Rights Act of 1875, which had prohibited discrimination in access to public services, that was not restored until the Civil Rights Act of 1964.

== Early life and education ==
Morrison Remick Waite was born on November 29, 1816, at Lyme, Connecticut, the son of Henry Matson Waite, an attorney, and his wife Maria Selden. His father later was appointed as a judge of the Superior Court and associate judge of the Supreme Court of Connecticut, serving 1834–1854; and appointed as chief justice of the latter from 1854 to 1857. Morrison had a brother Richard, with whom he later practiced law. His ancestors hailed from England and were New Englanders.

Waite attended Bacon Academy in Colchester, Connecticut, where one of his classmates was Lyman Trumbull. He graduated from Yale College in 1837, the same class that included Samuel J. Tilden, the 1876 Democratic presidential nominee. As a student at Yale, Waite became a member of the Skull and Bones and Brothers in Unity societies, and was elected to Phi Beta Kappa society in 1837. Shortly after graduating, Waite became a law clerk for his father in 1837.

Soon afterward Waite moved to Maumee, Ohio, where he read law in the office of Samuel L. Young. He was admitted to the bar in 1839, and went into practice with Young. The law firm became prominent in business and property law. Waite was elected mayor of Maumee, and served from 1846 to 1847.

== Marriage and family ==
He married Amelia Champlin Warner on September 21, 1840 in Hartford, Connecticut. They had three sons together: Henry Seldon, Christopher Champlin, and Edward Tinker; and a daughter Mary Frances Waite.

== Political and legal career ==
In 1850, Waite and his family moved to Toledo, Ohio, where he set up a branch office of his law firm with Young. Waite soon came to be recognized as a leader of the state bar. When Young retired in 1856, Waite built a prosperous new firm with his brother Richard Waite. One of his partners in Toledo was George P. Estey, a man from New Hampshire who served as a Union Army general during the American Civil War.

An active member of the Whig Party, Waite was elected to a term in the Ohio House of Representatives in 1849–1850. He made two unsuccessful bids for the United States Senate, and was offered (but declined) a seat on the Ohio Supreme Court. In the mid-1850s, because of his opposition to slavery, Waite joined the fledgling Republican Party and helped to organize it in his home state. By 1870, he was known as one of the best lawyers in Ohio.

In 1871, Waite received an invitation to represent the United States (along with William M. Evarts and Caleb Cushing) as counsel before the Alabama Tribunal at Geneva. In his first national role, he gained acclaim when he won a $15 million award from the tribunal. In 1872, he was unanimously selected to preside over the 1873 Ohio constitutional convention.

== Chief Justice of the United States, 1874–1888 ==
=== Nomination ===
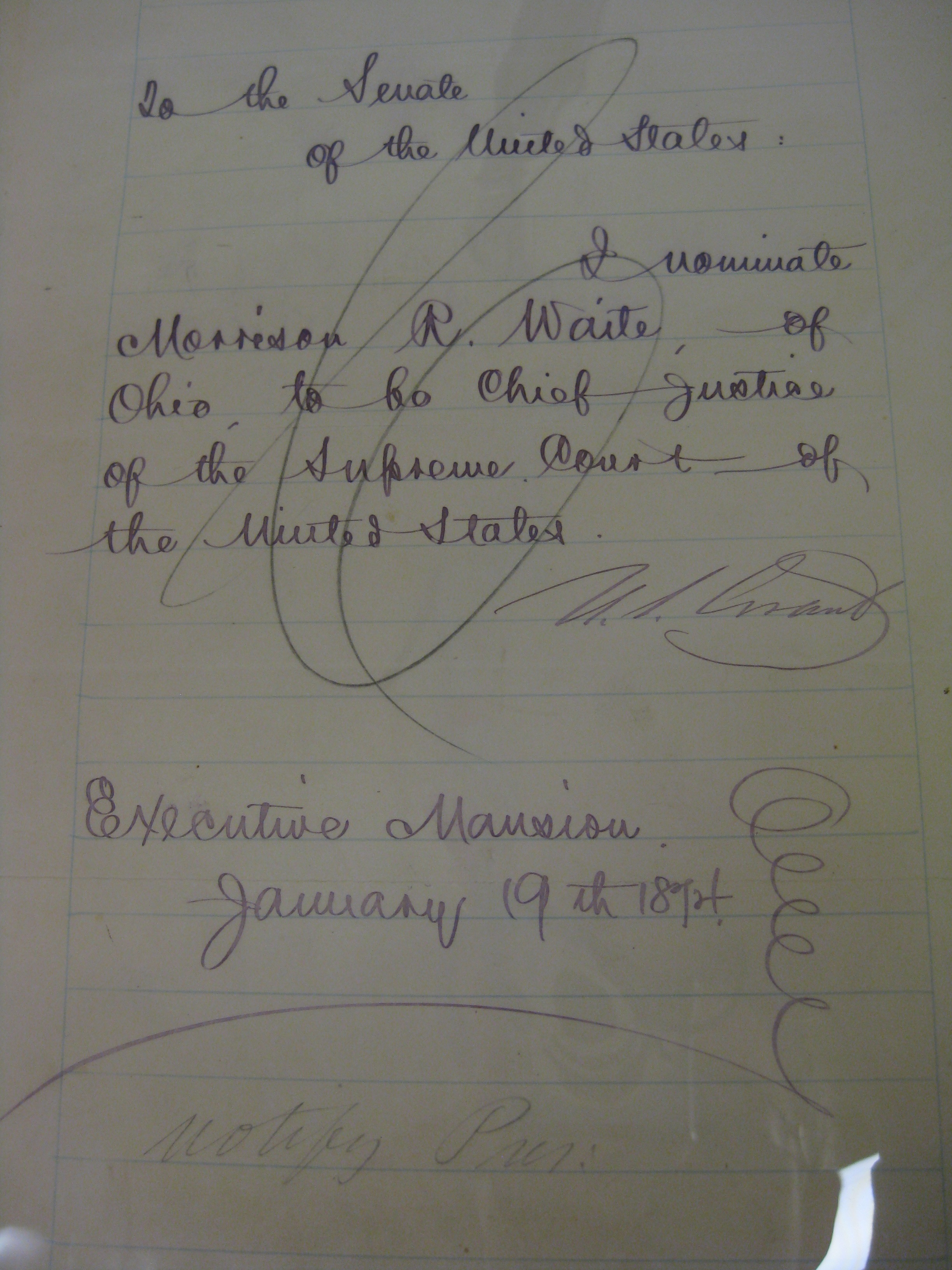
Waite's Chief Justice nomination

President Ulysses S. Grant nominated Waite as Chief Justice on January 19, 1874, after a political circus related to the appointment. Chief Justice Salmon P. Chase died in May 1873, and Grant waited six months before first offering the seat in November to the powerful Senator Roscoe Conkling of New York, who declined.

After ruling out a promotion of a sitting Associate Justice to Chief (despite much lobbying from the legal community for Justice Samuel Freeman Miller), Grant was determined to appoint an outsider as Chief Justice and offered the Chief Justiceship to senators Oliver Morton of Indiana and Timothy Howe of Wisconsin, then to his Secretary of State, Hamilton Fish. He finally submitted his nomination of Attorney General George H. Williams to the Senate on December 1. A month later, however, Grant withdrew the nomination, at Williams' request, after charges of corruption made his confirmation all but certain to fail. One day after withdrawing Williams, Grant nominated Democrat and former Attorney General Caleb Cushing, but withdrew it after Republican Senators alleged Civil War-era connections between Cushing and the Confederate President Jefferson Davis. Finally, after persistent lobbying from Ohioans, including Interior Secretary Columbus Delano, on January 19, 1874, Grant nominated the little-known Waite. He was notified of his nomination by a telegram.

The nomination was not well received in political circles. The former Secretary of the Navy, Gideon Welles, remarked of Waite that, "It is a wonder that Grant did not pick up some old acquaintance, who was a stage driver or bartender, for the place," and the political journal The Nation, said "Mr Waite stands in the front-rank of second-rank lawyers." Nationwide sentiment, however, was relief that a non-divisive and competent choice had been made, and Waite was confirmed unanimously as Chief Justice on January 21, 1874, receiving his commission the same day. Waite took the oaths of office on March 4, 1874.

=== Tenure ===
Waite's portrait as in Harper's Weekly, 1890

As Chief Justice, Waite never became a significant intellectual force on the Supreme Court. But his managerial and social skill, "especially his good humor and sensitivity to others, helped him to maintain a remarkably harmonious and productive court." During Waite's tenure, the Court decided some 3,470 cases. In part, the large number of cases decided and the variety of issues confronted reflected the lack of discretion the Court had at the time in hearing appeals from lower federal and state courts. However, Waite demonstrated an ability to get his brethren to reach decisions and write opinions without delay. His own work habits and output were formidable: he drafted one-third of these opinions.

In matters of regulation over economic activity, he supported broad national authority, stating his opinion that federal commerce powers must "keep pace with the progress of the country." In the same vein, a primary theme in his opinions was the balance of federal and state authority. These opinions influenced Supreme Court jurisprudence well into the 20th century.

In the cases that grew out of the American Civil War and Reconstruction, and especially in those that involved the interpretation of the Reconstruction Amendments, i.e. the Thirteenth, Fourteenth and Fifteenth amendments, Waite sympathized with the court's general tendency to interpret these amendments narrowly. In United States v. Cruikshank, the court struck down the Enforcement Act, ruling that the states had to be relied on to protect citizens from attack by other private citizens.

The very highest duty of the States, when they entered into the Union under the Constitution, was to protect all persons within their boundaries in the enjoyment of these 'unalienable rights with which they were endowed by their Creator.' Sovereignty, for this purpose, rests alone with the States. It is no more the duty or within the power of the United States to punish for a conspiracy to falsely imprison or murder within a State, than it would be to punish for false imprisonment or murder itself.

He concluded that "We may suspect that race was the cause of the hostility but is it not so averred."

Thus, the court overturned the convictions of three men accused of massacring at least 105 blacks in the Colfax massacre at the Grant Parish, Louisiana, courthouse on Easter 1873. Their convictions under the Enforcement Act were thrown out not because the statutes were unconstitutional, but because the indictments under which the men were charged were infirm because they failed to allege specifically that the murders were committed on account of the victims' race.

Waite believed that white moderates should set the rules of racial relations in the South. But, in reality, those states were not prepared to protect African Americans. They did not prosecute most lynchings or paramilitary attacks against blacks. The majority of the Court and the people outside the South were tired of the bitter racial strife related to Reconstruction. In the 1870s, white Democrats regained power in southern legislatures; they passed Jim Crow laws suppressing blacks as second-class citizens. After years of elections surrounded by fraud and violence to suppress black voting, from 1890 to 1908 (after Waite's death) all the Democrat-dominated southern state legislatures passed new constitutions or amendments that disfranchised most African Americans and many poor whites in the South. Well into the 1960s, these laws excluded those groups from the political system.

Waite's social and political orientation was also apparent in the Court's response to claims by other groups. In Minor v. Happersett (1875), using the restricted definition of national citizenship and the 14th Amendment as set forth in the Slaughterhouse Cases (1873), Waite upheld the states' right to deny women the franchise. Nonetheless, Waite sympathized with the women's rights movement and supported the admission of women to the Supreme Court bar.

In his opinion in Munn v. Illinois (1877), one of six Granger cases involving Populist-inspired state legislation to fix maximum rates chargeable by grain elevators and railroads, Waite wrote that when a business or private property was "affected with a public interest", it was subject to governmental regulation. Thus, the Court ruled against charges that Granger laws encroached upon private property rights without due process of law and conflicted with the Fourteenth Amendment. Later, this opinion was often regarded as a milestone in the growth of federal government regulation. In particular, New Dealers in the Franklin Roosevelt administration looked to Munn v. Illinois for guidance in interpreting due process, as well as the Commerce and Contract Clauses.

Waite concurred with the majority in the Head Money Cases (1884), the Ku-Klux Case (United States v. Harris, 1883), the Civil Rights Cases (1883), Pace v. Alabama (1883), and the Legal Tender Cases (including Juilliard v. Greenman) (1883). Among the most important opinions he personally wrote were the Enforcement Act Cases (1875), the Sinking Fund Cases (1878), the Railroad Commission Cases (1886) and the Telephone Cases (1887).

In 1876, amid speculation about a third term for President Grant, who had been tainted by scandals, some Republicans turned to Waite. They believed he was a better presidential nominee for the Republican Party. However, Waite refused, announcing "my duty [i]s not to make it a stepping stone to someone else but to preserve its purity and make my own name as honorable as that of any of my predecessors." In the aftermath of the presidential election of 1876, Waite refused to sit on the Electoral Commission that decided the electoral votes of Florida because of his close friendship with GOP presidential nominee Rutherford B. Hayes as well as being a Yale College classmate of Democratic presidential nominee Samuel J. Tilden.

As Chief Justice, Waite swore in Presidents Rutherford Hayes, James Garfield, Chester A. Arthur and Grover Cleveland. After suffering a breakdown, probably due to overwork, Waite refused to retire. Almost to the moment of his death, he continued to draft opinions and lead the Court.

=== Role in corporate personhood controversy ===
In 1885, S. W. Sanderson, who was the Chief Legal Advisor for the Southern Pacific Railroad, decided to sue Santa Clara County in California because it was trying to regulate the railroad's activity. His claim, in part, was that because a railroad was a 'person' under the Constitution, local governments couldn't 'discriminate' against it by having different laws and taxes in different places.

When Santa Clara County v. Southern Pacific Railroad Company, 118 U.S. 394 (1886), came before the Court, Sanderson asserted that 'corporate persons' should be treated the same as 'natural (or human) persons.' and although the Court specifically did not rule on it, the Reporter of Decisions, John Chandler Bancroft Davis, inserted the following dictum in the headnotes:

The court does not wish to hear argument on the question whether the provision in the Fourteenth Amendment to the Constitution, which forbids a State to deny to any person within its jurisdiction the equal protection of the laws, applies to these corporations. We are all of the opinion that it does.

Before publication, Davis wrote a letter to Waite, dated May 26, 1886, to make sure his headnote was correct, to which Waite replied:

I think your mem. in the California Railroad Tax cases expresses with sufficient accuracy what was said before the argument began. I leave it with you to determine whether anything need be said about it in the report inasmuch as we avoided meeting the constitutional question in the decision.^{[4]}

Hence this dictum in the headnote and the Waite reply changed the course of history and how corporations came to have the legal rights of a human person.

Thomas Hartmann, in his book Unequal Protection: The Rise of Corporate Dominance and Theft of Human Rights, has the following to say:

In these two sentences (according to the conventional wisdom), Waite weakened the kind of democratic republic the original authors of the Constitution had envisioned, and set the stage for the future worldwide damage of our environmental, governmental, and cultural commons. The plutocracy that had arisen with the East India Company in 1600, and been fought back by America's Founders, had gained a tool that was to allow them, in the coming decades, to once again gain control of most of North America, and then the world. Ironically, of the 307 Fourteenth Amendment cases brought before the Supreme Court in the years between his proclamation and 1910, only 19 dealt with African Americans: 288 were suits brought by corporations seeking the rights of natural persons.

== Death ==
Waite died unexpectedly of pneumonia on March 23, 1888. This created a stir in Washington, as there had been no hint that his illness was serious. His condition had been treated as confidential, in part to avoid alarming his wife who was in California. The Washington Post devoted its entire front page to his demise. Large crowds joined in the mourning. Except for Justices Bradley and Matthews, all the justices accompanied his body on the special train that went to Toledo, Ohio. Mrs. Waite traveled by train from California, arriving just in time for the funeral.

Published reports indicated the Chief Justice would be buried in a family plot he had purchased in Forest Hill Cemetery, but he was not interred there. Instead, he was buried in Woodlawn Cemetery, in Toledo, Ohio.

Waite, who had financial difficulties during his service as Chief Justice, left a very small estate that was insufficient to support his widow and daughters. Members of the organized Bar in Washington and New York raised money to create two funds for the benefit of Waite's family members.

On March 28, 1888 a House Funeral in the capitol building was held for the passing of Morrison Waite. In attendance at the funeral were President Grover Cleveland, First Lady Frances Cleveland, the Cabinet, and fellow Supreme Court justices.

== Legacy ==
Supreme Court Justice Felix Frankfurter said of Waite:

He did not confine the constitution within the limits of his own experience. ... The disciplined and disinterested lawyer in him transcended the bounds of the environment within which he moved and the views of the client whom he served at the bar.

Waite High School in Toledo, Ohio is named in his honor.

== See also ==
- Corporate personality
- Demographics of the Supreme Court of the United States
- List of justices of the Supreme Court of the United States
- List of United States Supreme Court justices by time in office
- List of United States Supreme Court cases by the Waite Court
- List of Skull and Bones members

== Sources ==
- Kens, Paul; Johnson, Herbert A. (2012). The Supreme Court under Morrison R. Waite, 1874-1888. University of South Carolina Press.

Legal offices
| Preceded by Salmon Chase | Chief Justice of the United States; 1874–1888 | Succeeded by Melville Fuller |
