= The Calendar of the Church Year =

Calendar of saints in the Episcopal Church

The Calendar of the Church Year is the liturgical calendar of the United States Episcopal Church. It is found in the 1979 Book of Common Prayer and in Lesser Feasts and Fasts, with additions made at recent General Conventions.

The veneration of saints in Anglicanism is a continuation of an ancient tradition from the early Church which honors important and influential people of the Christian faith. The usage of the term saint is similar to Roman Catholic and Orthodox traditions. Episcopalians believe in the communion of saints in prayer and as such the Episcopal liturgical calendar accommodates feasts for saints.

== Significance ==
The Calendar of the Church Year, as found in the authorized editions of the Book of Common Prayer and Lesser Feasts and Fasts, is the official calendar of The Episcopal Church.

There is no single calendar for the various church provinces which are part of the Anglican Communion; each makes its own calendar suitable for its local situation. Calendars in different provinces of the Anglican Communion will focus on figures more important to their own provinces. As a result, The Calendar of the Church Year contains a number of figures important in the history of the church in the United States, as well as figures of regional or global significance.

Different provinces often borrow important figures from each other's calendars, as the international importance of those figures become more prominent in their own provinces. In this way the calendar of the Episcopal Church in the United States has importance beyond just the immediate purpose of supporting the liturgy of the American church.

Because of its relation to the Episcopal Church of the United States, the Episcopal Church in the Philippines follows The Calendar of the Church Year rather closely.

The Calendar of the Church Year is one of the key sources of the calendar for the international daily office Oremus. Not every feast day celebrated by Episcopal churches is listed in the Calendar of the Church Year. For instance, many Anglo-Catholic chruches celebrate the Conception of the Virgin Mary on December 8, a day with no feast in the official Calendar.

== Sources ==
The Calendar of the Church Year is found in the 1928 Book of Common Prayer, in which it was simply called "The Calendar", and in the 1979 Book of Common Prayer, in which it bears its present name of "The Calendar of the Church Year". At present, the 1979 prayer book—and, by extension, its liturgical calendar—is the only one which is authorized for use. In some jurisdictions, the 1928 prayer book may be used with permission, along with the liturgical calendar of the 1979 prayer book.

Since 1964, the Episcopal Church has published additional books which expand the liturgical calendar. Most of these have borne the title Lesser Feasts and Fasts, although some have borne other titles. These books include:

- Lesser Feasts and Fasts, 1964
- Lesser Feasts and Fasts, 1973
- Lesser Feasts and Fasts, 1980
- Lesser Feasts and Fasts, 1988
- Lesser Feasts and Fasts, 1994
- Lesser Feasts and Fasts, 1997
- Lesser Feasts and Fasts, 2000
- Lesser Feasts and Fasts, 2003
- Lesser Feasts and Fasts, 2006
- Holy Women, Holy Men: Celebrating the Saints, 2010
- A Great Cloud of Witnesses, 2015
- Lesser Feasts and Fasts, 2018
- Lesser Feasts and Fasts, 2022
- Lesser Feasts and Fasts, 2024

The additions to the liturgical calendar, as published in these books, do not remain fixed from edition to edition. New observances are introduced for "trial use" in a newly published edition, then may be kept or removed in subsequent editions. Those which have remained in use for two consecutive editions, and which are to be kept thereafter, become permanent additions to the liturgical calendar, and are always included in subsequent editions.

The 2018 edition of the Lesser Feasts and Fasts was formally authorized for use at the 2022 General Convention. The 2006 edition of the Lesser Feasts and Fasts, which remains in popular use in traditional congregations, remains authorized for use as well. "The Calendar of the Church Year" as found in the authorized editions of the Book of Common Prayer and the Lesser Feasts and Fasts are the only authorized liturgical calendars for the Episcopal Church.

== History ==
=== Early calendars ===
When the Episcopal Church separated from the Church of England, it created a new version of the Book of Common Prayer, published in 1790. It listed only 25 holy days assigned to a specific date, nearly all of them honoring New Testament persons or events. This was similar to the 16th century prayer books and in contrast to England's prayer book in use at the time of the American Revolution. That prayer book had 93 holy dates, including the commemoration of King Charles the Martyr and the feast of the Restoration of Charles II, which were not included in the American version. The 1790 Episcopal calendar included a feast to honor "Civil and Religious Liberty" on July 4.

The calendar changed little in the 1892 revision of the Book of Common Prayer.

In the early 20th century, the Episcopal Church planned a revision to the book. The Commission of the Book of Common Prayer made official reports in 1916, 1919, and 1922 recommending the addition of 45 to 54 holy days. None of those were accepted, and the 1928 prayer book included none of the recommendations.

=== 20th-century revisions ===
Starting in 1950, the Standing Liturgical Commission released sixteen Prayer Book Studies during the process of creating what eventually became the Book of Common Prayer (1979). Two of those studies proposed new sanctoral calendars for the church.

Prayer Book Study IX was published in 1957. It proposed more than 80 new feasts to the calendar, including new major feasts for the Nativity of St. John the Baptist, Saint Mary Magdalene and Holy Cross Day.

Prayer Book Study XVI was published in 1964 as Lesser Feasts and Fasts. It was the first publication to bear that name, and also marked the first time feasts were approved for "trial use." It included more than 25 feasts that were not part of the 1957 publication. A second edition of Lesser Feasts and Fasts was published in 1973, added more than a dozen additional feasts. It was also authorized for trial use.

The first Lesser Feasts and Fasts calendar given final approval was the 1980 edition. Its calendar was published in the Book of Common Prayer's list of optional observances.

Lesser Feasts and Fasts was revised every three years when the General Convention met. Delegates to the convention submitted names to the calendar in the form of resolutions. The convention then voted to either reject a proposed feast, refer it to the Standing Commission on Liturgy to consider, add it to the calendar on a trial basis, or give it final approval. For example, the General Convention asked the committee to consider a feast for Hildegard of Bingen in 1991. It approved her feast on a trial basis in 1994 and gave it final approval in 1997.

=== 21st-century revisions ===
In 2003, the Standing Commission on Liturgy and Music began extensive work on calendar revision. It was charged with increasing the cultural diversity of the church's calendar. At the time, women made up about 7% of commemorations and most dates honored white male clergy.

In 2009, the General Convention authorized a new calendar for trial use, called Holy Women, Holy Men. The book had more than 100 additional commemorations to honor a variety of historical persons such as poet Christina Rossetti, astronomer Nicolaus Copernicus, and the Dorchester Chaplains. It increased the percentage of women represented by only 9 percentage points and was less racially diverse than past calendars.

Holy Women, Holy Men was approved with additions for three years of trial use again in 2012, with additions. It was never given final approval. The 2012 calendar introduced the occupation of "Prophetic Witness" for many of the non-ordained people being celebrated. This usage was dropped in the 2018 calendar revision.

In 2015, the commission submitted a new volume, A Great Cloud of Witnesses. It was envisioned as a replacement for Holy Women, Holy Men, and was introduced after study and collection opinion from Episcopalians online. The text of A Great Cloud of Witnesses stated that it was not intended to be a calendar of saints, but "an extended family history." The 2015 General Convention voted to make it available, but did not authorize it for trial use.

In 2018, the commission released a report saying the calendar had been thrown into a "situation of great confusion." It proposed a new calendar that updated Lesser Feasts and Fasts 2006, the last publication that had met with final authorization. It increased the percentages of women and laypersons to roughly 50%. The 2018 General Convention approved Lesser Feasts and Fasts for trial use. In addition to other reforms, this calendar shorted many titles by removing places of service (e.g., "Bishop of New Zealand" became simply "Bishop") with the exception of Archbishop of Canterbury.

The 2022, General Convention gave final authorization to the more than 90 feasts days that had been added as part of the Lesser Feasts and Fasts 2018 trial use calendar. This represented the largest number of additions to the calendar at a single general convention since 1979.

In 2024, General Convention finalized the removal of William Porcher DuBose from the calendar (previously August 18). It also finalized three feasts that had been under trial use since 2022: Barbara Clementine Harris, Simeon Bachos (the Ethiopian eunuch), and Frederick Howden, Jr. .

== Fixed dates ==
=== Ranking of observances ===
The Episcopal Church's Book of Common Prayer identifies four categories of feasts: Principal Feasts, other Feasts of our Lord (including Sundays), other Major Feasts, and minor feasts. Two major fast days are also listed (Ash Wednesday and Good Friday). In addition to these categories, further distinctions are made between feasts, to determine the precedence of feasts used when more than one feast falls on the same day. In addition, Lesser Feasts and Fasts gives further rules for the relative ranking of feasts and fasts. These rules of precedence all establish a ranking, from most to least important, as follows:

- Principal Feasts
- The Feasts of the Holy Name, the Presentation, and Transfiguration
- Sundays through the year
- Ash Wednesday and Good Friday
- Feasts of our Lord
- Other Major Feasts
- Weekdays of Lent
- Minor feasts

=== Days of fasting and prayer ===
Ash Wednesday and Good Friday are appointed as major fast days with special services. "Days of special observance" or lesser fast days include all the weekdays of Lent and every Friday in the year, with the exception that fasting is never observed during the Easter or Christmas seasons, or on Feasts of our Lord. The Episcopal Church does not prescribe the specific manner of observance of these days.

Other days for prayer and optional fasting include rogation days, traditionally observed on April 25 and the three weekdays before Ascension Day, as well as the sets of Ember days four times each year.

=== Baptismal feasts ===
The Great Vigil of Easter, Pentecost, All Saints' Day, and The Baptism of our Lord, are appointed as baptismal feasts. It is preferred that baptism be reserved for those occasions.

== Calendar ==
The calendar below gives the Calendar of the Church Year as published in the 2024 edition of Lesser Feasts and Fasts.

The three fixed Principal Feasts (All Saints', Christmas, and Epiphany) are in BOLD, ALL CAPS. Feasts of our Lord are in bold italics. Other Major Feasts and Fasts are in bold. Lesser feasts authorized for trial use are in square brackets

=== Movable days ===
The following observances occur on different dates depending on the date of Easter.

- **Ash Wednesday**
- **Good Friday**
- **EASTER DAY**
- **ASCENSION DAY**
- **DAY OF PENTECOST**
- **TRINITY SUNDAY**

Thanksgiving Day is a feast on the fourth Thursday of November in the United States which may be celebrated on another day elsewhere. In addition, every Sunday in the year is observed as a "feast of our Lord".

The celebration of the first Book of Common Prayer, 1549, was formerly a movable feast, observed on a weekday following Pentecost, but has since 2024 been fixed to June 13.

=== January ===
- 1 **The Holy Name of Our Lord Jesus Christ**
- 4 Elizabeth Ann Seton, Monastic and Educator, 1821
- 5 Sarah, Theodora, and Syncletica of Egypt, Desert Mothers, fourth–fifthth century
- 6 **THE EPIPHANY OF OUR LORD JESUS CHRIST**
- 8 Harriet Bedell, Deaconess and Missionary, 1969
- 9 Julia Chester Emery, Lay Leader and Missionary, 1922
- 10 William Laud, Archbishop of Canterbury, 1645
- 12 Aelred of Rievaulx, Abbot, 1167
- 13 Hilary of Poitiers, Bishop, 367
- 14 Richard Meux Benson, Priest, and Charles Gore, Bishop, 1915 and 1932
- 17 Antony of Egypt, Monastic, 356
- 18 **The Confession of Saint Peter the Apostle**
- 19 Wulfstan of Worcester, Bishop, 1095
- 20 Fabian, Bishop and Martyr, 250
- 21 Agnes and Cecilia of Rome, Martyrs, 304 and c. 230
- 22 Vincent of Saragossa, Deacon and Martyr, 304
- 23 Phillips Brooks, Bishop, 1893
- 24 Florence Li Tim-Oi, Priest, 1944
- 25 **The Conversion of Saint Paul the Apostle**
- 26 Timothy and Titus, Companions of Saint Paul
- 27 John Chrysostom, Bishop and Theologian, 407
- 28 Thomas Aquinas, Friar and Theologian, 1274
- 29 [Liliʻuokalani of Hawaiʻi]
- 31 Marcella of Rome, Monastic and Scholar, 410

=== February ===
- 1 Brigid of Kildare, Monastic, 523
- 2 **The Presentation of Our Lord Jesus Christ in the Temple**
- 3 Anskar, Bishop and Missionary, 865
- 4 Manche Masemola, Martyr, 1928
- 5 Agatha of Sicily, Martyr, c. 251
- 5 The Martyrs of Japan, 1597
- 8 Bakhita (Josephine Margaret Bakhita), Monastic, 1947
- 10 Scholastica, Monastic, 543
- 11 The Consecration of Barbara Clementine Harris, First Woman Bishop in the Anglican Communion, 1989
- 12 Theodora, Empress, c. 867
- 13 Absalom Jones, Priest, 1818
- 14 Cyril and Methodius, Missionaries, 869 and 885
- 15 Thomas Bray, Priest and Missionary, 1730
- 17 Janani Luwum, Archbishop and Martyr, 1977
- 18 Martin Luther, Pastor and Reformer 1546
- 19 Agnes Tsao Kou Ying, Agatha Lin Zhao, and Lucy Yi Zhenmei, Catechists and Martyrs, 1856, 1858, and 1862
- 20 Frederick Douglass, Social Reformer, 1895
- 22 Margaret of Cortona, Monastic, 1297
- 23 Polycarp of Smyrna, Bishop and Martyr, 156
- 24 **Saint Matthias the Apostle**
- 25 Emily Malbone Morgan, Lay Leader and Contemplative, 1937
- 26 Photini, The Samaritan Woman, c. 67
- 27 George Herbert, Priest and Poet, 1633
- 28 Anna Julia Haywood Cooper, Educator, 1964

=== March ===
- 1 David of Wales, Bishop, c. 544
- 2 Chad of Lichfield, Bishop, 672
- 3 John and Charles Wesley, Priests, 1791, 1788
- 7 Perpetua and Felicity, Martyrs, 202
- 9 Gregory of Nyssa, Bishop and Theologian, c. 394
- 10 Harriet Ross Tubman, Social Reformer, 1913
- 12 Gregory the Great, Bishop and Theologian, 604
- 13 James Theodore Holly, Bishop, 1911
- 15 Vincent de Paul, Priest, and Louise de Marillac, Vowed Religious, Workers of Charity, 1660
- 17 Patrick of Ireland, Bishop and Missionary, 461
- 18 Cyril of Jerusalem, Bishop and Theologian, 386
- 19 **Saint Joseph**
- 20 Cuthbert, Bishop, 687
- 21 Thomas Ken, Bishop, 1711
- 22 James De Koven, Priest, 1879
- 23 Gregory the Illuminator, Bishop and Missionary, c. 332
- 24 Óscar Romero, Archbishop and Martyr, 1980, and the Martyrs of El Salvador
- 25 **The Annunciation of Our Lord Jesus Christ to the Blessed Virgin Mary**
- 26 Harriet Monsell, Monastic, 1883
- 27 Charles Henry Brent, Bishop, 1929
- 28 James Solomon Russell, Priest, 1935
- 29 John Keble, Priest and Poet, 1866
- 30 Mary of Egypt, Monastic, c. 421
- 31 John Donne, Priest and Poet, 1631

=== April ===
- 1 Frederick Denison Maurice, Priest, 1872
- 2 James Lloyd Breck, Priest, 1876
- 3 Richard of Chichester, Bishop, 1253
- 4 Martin Luther King Jr., Pastor and Martyr, 1968
- 5 Harriet Starr Cannon, Monastic, 1896
- 7 Tikhon, Bishop and Ecumenist, 1925
- 8 William Augustus Muhlenberg, Priest, 1877
- 9 Dietrich Bonhoeffer, Pastor and Theologian, 1945
- 10 William Law, Priest, 1761.
- 11 George Augustus Selwyn, Bishop, 1878
- 14 Zenaida, Philonella, and Hermione, Unmercenary Physicians, c. 100, c. 117
- 15 Damien, Priest, 1889, and Marianne Cope, Monastic, 1918, of Hawaiʻi
- 16 Peter William Cassey, Deacon, 1917 and Annie Besant Cassey, 1875
- 17 Kateri Tekakwitha, Lay Contemplative, 1680
- 18 Juana Inés de la Cruz, Monastic and Theologian, 1695
- 19 Alphege, Archbishop of Canterbury, and Martyr, 1012
- 21 Anselm, Archbishop of Canterbury and Theologian, 1109
- 22 Hadewijch of Brabant, Poet and Mystic, thirteenth century
- 23 Toyohiko Kagawa, Social Reformer, 1960
- 25 **Saint Mark the Evangelist**
- 27 Zita of Tuscany, Worker of Charity, 1271
- 29 Catherine of Siena, Mystic and Prophetic Witness, 1380

=== May ===
- 1 **The Apostles Saint Philip and Saint James**
- 2 Athanasius of Alexandria, Bishop and Theologian, 373
- 3 Elisabeth Cruciger, Poet and Hymnographer, 1535
- 4 Monica, Mother of Augustine of Hippo, 387
- 5 Martyrs of the Reformation Era
- 6 [George of Lydda, Soldier and Martyr, c. 304]
- 8 Julian of Norwich, Mystic and Theologian, c. 1417
- 9 Gregory of Nazianzus, Bishop and Theologian, 389
- 11 Johann Arndt and Jacob Boehme, Mystics, 1621 and 1624
- 13 Frances Perkins, Social Reformer, 1965
- 15 Pachomius of Tabenissi, Monastic, 348
- 17 Thurgood Marshall, Public Servant, 1993
- 19 Dunstan, Archbishop of Canterbury, 988
- 20 Alcuin of York, Deacon, 804
- 21 Lydia of Thyatira, Coworker of the Apostle Paul
- 22 Helena of Constantinople, Protector of the Holy Places, 330
- 24 Jackson Kemper, Bishop and Missonary, 1870
- 25 Bede, Priest and Historian, 735
- 26 Augustine, First Archbishop of Canterbury, 605
- 28 Mechthild of Magdeburg, Mystic, c. 1282
- 31 **The Visitation of the Blessed Virgin Mary**

=== June ===
- 1 Justin, Martyr, 167
- 2 Blandina and Her Companions, The Martyrs of Lyons, 177
- 3 The Martyrs of Uganda, 1886
- 4 John XXIII (Angelo Giuseppe Roncalli), Bishop, 1963
- 5 Boniface, Bishop and Missionary, 754
- 8 Melania the Elder, Monastic, 410
- 9 Columba of Iona, Monastic, 597
- 10 Ephrem of Nisibis, Deacon and Poet, 373
- 11 **Saint Barnabas the Apostle**
- 12 Enmegahbowh, Priest and Missionary, 1902
- 13 The First Book of Common Prayer, 1549
- 14 Basil of Caesarea, Bishop and Theologian, 379
- 15 Evelyn Underhill, Mystic and Writer, 1941
- 16 Joseph Butler, Bishop and Theologian, 1752
- 17 Marina the Monk, Monastic, fifth century
- 18 Bernard Mizeki, Martyr, 1896
- 19 Adelaide Teague Case, Educator, 1948
- 22 Alban, Martyr, c. 304
- 24 **The Nativity of Saint John the Baptist**
- 26 Isabel Florence Hapgood, Ecumenist, 1929
- 28 Irenaeus of Lyons, Bishop and Theologian, c. 202
- 29 **The Apostles Saint Peter and Saint Paul**

=== July ===
- 1 Pauli Murray, Priest, 1985
- 2 Moses the Black, Monastic and Martyr, c. 400
- 4 **Independence Day** (United States)
- 6 Eva Lee Matthews, Monastic, 1928
- 8 Priscilla and Aquila, Coworkers of the Apostle Paul
- 11 Benedict of Nursia, Monastic, 543
- 14 Argula von Grumbach, Scholar and Church Reformer, c. 1554
- 17 William White, Bishop, 1836
- 19 Macrina of Caesarea, Monastic and Teacher, 379.
- 20 Elizabeth Cady Stanton, Amelia Bloomer, and Sojourner Truth, Social Reformers, 1902, 1894, and 1883
- 21 Maria Skobtsova, Monastic and Martyr, 1945
- 22 **Saint Mary Magdalene**
- 23 John Cassian, Monastic and Theologian, 435
- 24 Thomas à Kempis, Priest and Mystic, 1471
- 25 **Saint James the Apostle**
- 26 The Parents of the Blessed Virgin Mary (traditionally identified as Anne and Joachim)
- 27 William Reed Huntington, Priest, 1909
- 28 Johann Sebastian Bach, Composer, 1750
- 29 Mary and Martha of Bethany
- 29 [The Ordination of the Philadelphia Eleven]
- 30 William Wilberforce, Social Reformer, 1833
- 31 Ignatius of Loyola, Priest and Spiritual Writer, 1556

=== August ===
- 1 Joseph of Arimathaea
- 3 Joanna, Mary, and Salome, Myrrh-Bearing Women
- 6 **The Transfiguration of Our Lord Jesus Christ**
- 7 John Mason Neale, Priest and Hymnographer, 1866.
- 8 Dominic, Priest and Friar, 1221
- 9 Edith Stein (Teresa Benedicta of the Cross), Philosopher, Monastic, and Martyr, 1942
- 10 Laurence of Rome, Deacon and Martyr, 258
- 11 Clare of Assisi, Monastic, 1253
- 12 Florence Nightingale, Nurse, 1910
- 13 Jeremy Taylor, Bishop and Theologian, 1667
- 14 Jonathan Myrick Daniels, Martyr, 1965
- 15 **Saint Mary the Virgin, Mother of Our Lord Jesus Christ**
- 20 Bernard of Clairvaux, Monastic and Theologian, 1153
- 24 **Saint Bartholomew the Apostle**
- 25 Louis, King, 1270
- 26 Simeon Bachos the Ethiopian Eunuch
- 27 Thomas Gallaudet and Henry Winter Syle, Priests, 1902 and 1890
- 28 Augustine of Hippo, Bishop and Theologian, 430
- 29 The Beheading of Saint John the Baptist
- 30 Margaret Ward, Margaret Clitherow, and Anne Line, Martyrs, 1588, 1586, and 1601
- 31 Aidan of Lindisfarne, Bishop, 651

=== September ===
- 1 David Pendleton Oakerhater, Deacon, 1931
- 2 The Martyrs of New Guinea, 1942
- 3 Phoebe, Deacon
- 4 Paul Jones, Bishop, 1941
- 5 Katharina Zell, Church Reformer and Writer, 1562
- 6 Hannah More, Religious Writer and Philanthropist, 1833
- 7 [Élie Naud, Huguenot Witness to the Faith, 1722]
- 7 Kassiani, Poet and Hymnographer, 865
- 8 The Nativity of the Blessed Virgin Mary
- 9 Constance, Thecla, Ruth, Frances, Charles Parsons, and Louis Schuyler, Martyrs, 1878
- 10 Alexander Crummell, Priest, 1898
- 12 John Henry Hobart, Bishop of New York, 1830
- 13 Cyprian of Carthage, Bishop and Martyr, 258
- 14 **Holy Cross Day**
- 15 Catherine of Genoa, Mystic and Nurse, 1510
- 16 Ninian, Bishop, c. 430
- 17 Hildegard of Bingen, Mystic and Scholar, 1179
- 18 Edward Bouverie Pusey, Priest, 1882
- 19 Theodore of Tarsus, Archbishop of Canterbury, 690
- 20 John Coleridge Patteson, Bishop, and his Companions, Martyrs, 1871
- 21 **Saint Matthew, Apostle and Evangelist**
- 22 Philander Chase, Bishop, 1852
- 23 Thecla of Iconium, Proto-Martyr Among Women, c. 70
- 24 Anna Ellison Butler Alexander, Deaconess and Teacher, 1947
- 25 Sergius of Radonezh, Monastic, 1392
- 26 Lancelot Andrewes, Bishop, 1626
- 27 Euphrosyne/Smaragdus of Alexandria, Monastic, fifth century
- 28 Paula and Eustochium of Rome, Monastics and Scholars, 404 and c. 419
- 29 **Saint Michael and All Angels**
- 30 Jerome, Priest, and Scholar, 420

=== October ===
- 1 Therese of Lisieux, Monastic, 1898]
- 1 Remegius of Rheims, Bishop, c. 530
- 3 John Raleigh Mott, Ecumenist and Missionary, 1955
- 4 Francis of Assisi, Friar and Deacon, 1226
- 6 William Tyndale, Priest, 1536
- 7 Birgitta of Sweden, Mystic, 1373
- 9 Robert Grosseteste, Bishop, 1253
- 10 Vida Dutton Scudder, Educator, 1954
- 11 Philip, Deacon and Evangelist
- 12 Edith Cavell, Nurse, 1915
- 14 Samuel Isaac Joseph Schereschewsky, Bishop and Missionary, 1906
- 15 Teresa of Avila, Mystic and Monastic Reformer, 1582
- 16 Hugh Latimer and Nicholas Ridley, Bishops and Martyrs, 1555 and Thomas Cranmer, Archbishop of Canterbury, 1556
- 17 Ignatius of Antioch, Bishop and Martyr, c. 115
- 18 **Saint Luke the Evangelist**
- 19 Henry Martyn, Priest, and Missionary, 1812.
- 20 Cornelius the Centurion
- 23 **Saint James of Jerusalem, Brother of our Lord Jesus Christ and Martyr,** c. 62
- 25 Tabitha (Dorcas) of Joppa
- 26 Alfred, King, 899
- 28 **Saint Simon and Saint Jude, Apostles**
- 29 James Hannington, Bishop, and his Companions, Martyrs, 1885
- 30 Maryam of Qidun, Monastic, fourth century

=== November ===
- 1 **ALL SAINTS**
- 2 All Souls / All the Faithful Departed
- 3 Richard Hooker, Priest and Theologian, 1600
- 4 [Adeline Blanchard Tyler and her Companions]
- 6 William Temple, Archbishop of Canterbury, 1944
- 7 Willibrord, Bishop and Missionary, 739
- 8 Ammonius, Hermit, c. 403
- 9 Richard Rolle, Walter Hilton and Margery Kempe, Mystics, 1349, 1396, and c. 1440
- 10 Leo of Rome, Bishop, 461
- 11 Martin of Tours, Bishop, 397
- 12 Charles Simeon, Priest, 1836
- 14 The Consecration of Samuel Seabury, 1784
- 15 Herman of Alaska, Missionary, 1837
- 16 Margaret of Scotland, Queen, 1093
- 17 Hugh of Lincoln, Bishop, 1200
- 18 Hilda of Whitby, Abbess, 680
- 19 Elizabeth of Hungary, Princess, 1231
- 20 Edmund, King, 870
- 21 Mechthilde of Hackeborn and Gertrude the Great, Mystics and Theologians, 1298 and 1302
- 22 Clive Staples Lewis, Apologist and Spiritual Writer, 1963
- 23 Clement of Rome, Bishop, c. 100
- 24 Catherine of Alexandria, Barbara of Nicomedia, and Margaret of Antioch, Martyrs, c. 305
- 25 James Otis Sargent Huntington, Monastic and Priest, 1935
- 28 Kamehameha and Emma of Hawaiʻi, King and Queen, 1863 and 1885
- 30 **Saint Andrew the Apostle**

=== December ===
- 1 Charles de Foucauld, Monastic and Martyr, 1916
- 2 Channing Moore Williams, Bishop and Missionary, 1910
- 3 Francis Xavier, Priest and Missionary, 1552
- 4 John of Damascus, Priest and Theologian, c. 760
- 5 Clement of Alexandria, Priest and Theologian, c. 210
- 6 Nicholas of Myra, Bishop, c. 342
- 7 Ambrose of Milan, Bishop and Theologian, 397
- 8 Nicholas Ferrar, Deacon, 1637
- 11 Frederick Howden, Jr., Priest and Chaplain of the Armed Forces, 1942
- 12 Francis de Sales, Bishop, and Jane de Chantal, Vowed Religious, 1622 and 1641
- 13 Lucy of Syracuse Martyr, 304
- 14 John of the Cross, Mystic and Monastic Reformer, 1591
- 15 Nino of Georgia, Missionary, c. 332
- 17 Dorothy L. Sayers, Apologist and Spiritual Writer, 1957
- 20 Katharina von Bora, Church Reformer, 1552
- 21 **Saint Thomas the Apostle**
- 25 **THE NATIVITY OF OUR LORD JESUS CHRIST**
- 26 **Saint Stephen, Deacon and Martyr**
- 27 **Saint John, Apostle and Evangelist**
- 28 **Holy Innocents**
- 29 Thomas Becket, Archbishop of Canterbury and Martyr, 1170
- 31 Frances Joseph Gaudet, Educator and Social Reformer, 1934

=== Trial Use ===
The 2024 General Convention authorized five feasts for trial use.

- Liliʻuokalani of Hawai'i, Jan. 29
- George of Lydda, May 6
- The Ordination of the Philadelphia Eleven, July 29
- Élie Neau, Sept. 7
- Adeline Blanchard Tyler and her Companions, Nov. 4

It also gave final authorization to the deletion of William Porcher DuBose (Aug. 18, 1918) from the calendar.

In addition, it authorized the trial use of new dates for seven feasts:

- Cornelius the Centurion from Feb. 4 to Oct. 20
- The Martyrs of Japan from Feb. 5 to Feb. 6
- Theodora from Feb. 11 to Feb. 12
- Mary of Egypt from April 3 to Mar. 30
- Remigius of Rheims from Oct. 1 to Oct. 2
- Nicholas Ferrar from Dec. 1 to Dec. 8
- Fix the feast of the first Book of Common Prayer to June 13

== See also ==
- Calendar of saints
- Calendar of saints (Church of England)
- General Roman Calendar
