= Eva Lee Matthews =

Episcopal community founder and saint

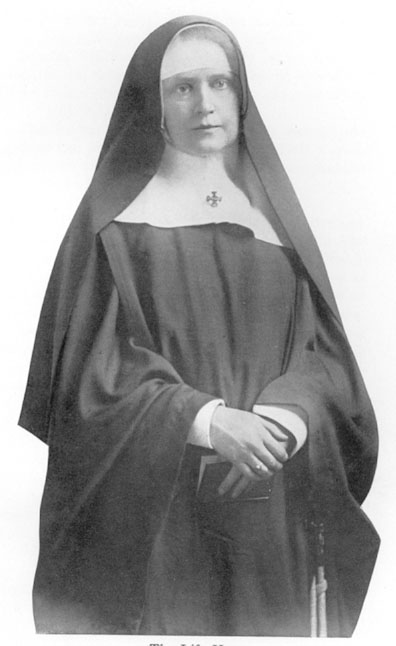
- Born: September 9, 1862; Glendale, Ohio
- Died: July 6, 1928 (aged 65)
- Venerated in: Episcopal Church (United States)
- Canonized: 2022
- Feast: July 6

Eva Lee Matthews (1862–1928) was an Episcopal nun best known for founding the Community of the Transfiguration.

== Early life ==
Eva Lee Matthews was born on September 9, 1862, in Glendale, Ohio. Her father, Stanley Matthews, was a Union officer in the Civil War and later became a Supreme Court justice.

He was elected to the U.S. Senate and the family moved to Washington, D.C., where Eva Lee Matthews attended Wellesley College.

As an adult, Eva traveled to Palestine. The book "A Little Pilgrimage to Holy Places" is an account of her travels. She also went to England, where she spent several months visiting various religious communities, including the Sisters of the Holy Paraclete in Whitby. Inspired by the work of these religious orders and others she visited in the United States, Matthews developed a desire to establish a similar community in her home country.

== Community of the Transfiguration ==
In 1898, Eva Lee Matthews, along with a small group of women, founded the Community of the Transfiguration, an Episcopal religious order for women in Glendale. The community was dedicated to serving the needs of the church and the wider community through prayer, worship, and social outreach. The sisters of the community took vows of poverty, chastity, and obedience, and they lived a life of simplicity and service.

At this time, she began to use the name Sister Eva Mary.

Under Eva's leadership, the Community of the Transfiguration grew and expanded its outreach efforts. The sisters established schools, orphanages, and hospitals, providing essential services and support to those in need. One of their most notable achievements was the founding of the Bethany School, a boarding school for girls that provided a high-quality education to underprivileged children. In addition to their work in the United States, the Community of the Transfiguration became the first Episcopal community to send missionaries overseas, creating a religious house in Wuhu, China.

She remained head of the community until her death in 1928.

== Legacy ==
The Episcopal Church honors her with a feast day on its church calendar on July 6.
