= Alfred L. Banyard =

American bishop (1908–1992)

The Right Reverend Alfred L. Banyard D.D., S.T.D.
- Bishop of New Jersey
- Church: Episcopal Church
- Diocese: New Jersey
- Elected: January 8, 1955
- In office: 1955–1973
- Predecessor: Wallace John Gardner
- Successor: Albert W. Van Duzer
- Previous post: Suffragan Bishop of New Jersey (1945-1955)

Orders
- Ordination: August 1932 by Paul Matthews
- Consecration: September 29, 1945 by Henry St. George Tucker

Personal details
- Born: July 31, 1908 Merchantville, New Jersey, United States
- Died: September 6, 1992 (aged 84) Moorestown, New Jersey, United States
- Buried: St. Mary's Episcopal Church, Burlington, New Jersey
- Denomination: Anglican
- Spouse: Sarah Alice Hammer
- Children: 1

Alfred Lothian Banyard (July 31, 1908 - September 6, 1992) was seventh bishop of the Episcopal Diocese of New Jersey, serving from 1955 to 1973.

== Biography ==
Banyard was born on July 31, 1908, in Merchantville, New Jersey, the son of Lothian Rupert Banyard and Emma May Irwin. He was educated at the Camden High School in Camden, New Jersey and graduated with a Bachelor of Arts from the University of Pennsylvania in 1929 and then studied at the General Theological Seminary between 1929 and 1931 from where he gained his Bachelor of Sacred Theology in 1933. He was awarded a Doctor of Sacred Theology from General Theological Seminary in 1946 and a Doctor of Divinity from Philadelphia Divinity School in 1947.

He was ordained deacon in June 1931 and priest in August 1932. In 1932 he became rector of St Luke's Church in Westville, New Jersey and in 1936 transferred to Bordentown, New Jersey to become rector of Christ Church. In 1943 he became Archdeacon of New Jersey, a post he retained till 1955. In 1945 he was elected Suffragan Bishop of New Jersey and was consecrated on September 29, 1945, in Trinity Cathedral by Presiding Bishop Henry St. George Tucker. He was elected Bishop of New Jersey in 1955 and served till his retirement in 1973.

== Bibliography ==
- (foreword), To pray or not to pray!: A handbook for study of recent Supreme Court decisions and American church-state doctrine (University Press of Washington, D.C., 1968)
