= Michael Buerkel Hunn =

Episcopal Bishop in the US

The Right Reverend Michael Buerkel Hunn
- Bishop of the Rio Grande
- Church: Episcopal Church
- Diocese: Rio Grande
- Elected: May 5, 2018
- In office: 2018-present
- Predecessor: Michael Vono

Orders
- Ordination: 1996
- Consecration: November 3, 2018 by Michael Curry

Personal details
- Denomination: Anglican
- Spouse: Meg Buerkel Hunn (m. 2009)
- Children: 3

Michael Buerkel Hunn is an American prelate of the Episcopal Church who currently serves as the Bishop of the Rio Grande.

== Biography ==
Hunn grew up in New Mexico and Texas. He studied at Middlebury College from where he graduated with a Bachelor of Arts in history and religion in 1993, and then undertook further undergraduate study at the University of Cambridge, where he gained a Master of Arts in theology. He also earned a Certificate of Advanced Theological Study from Seabury-Western Theological Seminary in 1996.

He was ordained deacon and priest in 1996 and served as chaplain at Kent School, head baseball coach, and chair of the Theology Department. He then became a senior associate rector of the Church of the Holy Comforter in Kenilworth, Illinois and later chaplain at Davidson College and associate rector of St Alban’s Church in Davidson, North Carolina. In 2006 he was appointed Canon to the Ordinary in the Diocese of North Carolina, while in 2015, he was chosen by the Presiding Bishop to serve as his canon to oversee ministry within the Episcopal Church.

Hunn was elected as the 11th Bishop of the Rio Grande on May 5, 2018 on the third ballot, at the Cathedral of St John in Albuquerque, New Mexico. He was consecrated bishop on November 3, 2018 at the First Presbyterian Church in Albuquerque, New Mexico by Presiding Bishop Michael Curry as chief consecrator. He married the Reverend Meg Buerkel Hunn on June 27, 2009, and together have three children.
