= Soon Hing v. Crowley =

- Supreme Court of the United States

Argued January 28, 1885 Decided March 16, 1885
- Full case name: Soon Hing v. Crowley
- Citations: 113 U.S. 703 (more) 5 S. Ct. 730; 28 L. Ed. 1145

Court membership
- Chief Justice Morrison Waite Associate Justices Samuel F. Miller · Stephen J. Field; Joseph P. Bradley · John M. Harlan; William B. Woods · Stanley Matthews; Horace Gray · Samuel Blatchford

Case opinion
- Majority: Field, joined by unanimous

Soon Hing v. Crowley, 113 U.S. 703 (1885), was a case decided by the Supreme Court of the United States.

== Background ==
=== Law ===
The City and County of San Francisco instituted a ordinance prohibiting the washing and ironing in public laundries and wash houses within defined territorial limits from ten o'clock at night to six in the morning. The intent of the law was to crack down on Asian American laundromats during a period of heightened anti-Asian bias in the United States.

A San Francisco prosecutor anticipated that the ordinance would be challenged on racial grounds under the Fourteenth Amendment. Wanting to protect the ordinance and continue the discrimination, that prosecutor conspired with a white laundromat owner to create a case in the hopes that it would go to the Supreme Court without racial animus being at the center of the case. This plan was successful, and Barbier v. Connolly was decided before Soon Hing. In Barbier, the Supreme Court upheld the ordinance as a valid exercise of the police power without considering race.

=== Facts ===
The plaintiff, Soon Hing, had been arrested by the defendant, the San Francisco Chief of Police, for violating the same ordinance considered in Barbier.

The petition for the writ of habeas corpus set forth the arrest and detention of the petitioner by the chief of police, the ordinance under which the arrest was made, the complaint before the police judge, and the issue of the warrant under which he was taken into custody. It then proceeds to state that the petitioner had for several years been engaged in working for hire in a public laundry in the City and County of San Francisco, and complied with all the laws of the United States and of California and the ordinances of the city and county except in washing at the hours mentioned; that the business of carrying on a laundry is a lawful one, in which a large number of the subjects of the Emperor of China have been and are engaged in the said city and county within the limits prescribed by the ordinance; that there have been for several years great antipathy and hatred on the part of the residents of that city and county against the subjects of China residing and doing business there; that such antipathy and hatred have manifested themselves in various ways and under various forms for the purpose of compelling the subjects of China to quit and abandon their business and residence in the city and county and state; that owing to that feeling, and not otherwise, and not for any sanitary, police, or other legitimate purpose, but in order to force those subjects engaged in carrying on the business of a laundry in the City and County of San Francisco to abandon the exercise of their lawful vocation and their only means of livelihood, the supervisors passed the ordinance in question; that the petitioner has been and is earning his living exclusively by working at washing and ironing for hire, and in order to gain a livelihood is obliged to work late in the night, and has no other lawful vocation; that on the first of January 1884, his employer paid the license collector of the city and county six dollars, the amount required by the ordinance to obtain a license to carry on the business of a laundry, and obtained from him a license to carry on the business at a designated place within the prescribed limits. The petition also avers that section four of the ordinance is in contravention of the provisions of the Burlingame Treaty and of the Fourteenth Amendment to the Constitution of the United States in that it deprives them of the equal protection of the laws.

== Issue before the court ==
On hearing of the application for the writ, the judges of the circuit court were divided in opinion on several questions that arose. The questions were:

1. Whether section four of the ordinance mentioned is void on the ground that it is not within the police power of the Board of Supervisors of the City and County of San Francisco.
2. Whether said section is void on the ground that it discriminates between those engaged in the laundry business and those engaged in other classes of business.
3. Whether said section is void on the ground that it discriminates between the different classes of persons engaged in the laundry business.
4. Whether said section is void on the ground that it deprives a man of the right to labor at all times.
5. Whether said section is void on the ground that it is unreasonable in its requirements, in restraint of trade, or upon any other ground apparent upon the face of the ordinance, or appearing in the petition.

== Opinion of the court ==
The opinion of the presiding judge being that the said section was valid and constitutional, the application for the writ was denied, and the judgment entered upon the denial is brought to the high court for review.

Justice Stephen J. Field, delivered the opinion of the Court.

The ordinance of the Board of Supervisors of the City and County of San Francisco, the legislative authority of that municipality, approved on 25 June 1883, is similar in its main features to the ordinance under consideration at this term in Barbier v. Connolly, ante, page 113 U. S. 27. It differs in the designation of the limits of the district of the city and county within which its provisions are to be enforced, but not otherwise in any essential particular. The fourth section is identical in both. The prohibition against labor on Sunday in this section is not involved here, as it was not in that case, and the provision for the cessation of labor in the laundries within certain prescribed limits of the city and county during certain hours of the night is purely a police regulation which is, as we there said, within the competency of any municipality possessed of the ordinary powers belonging to such bodies. Besides, the Constitution of California declares that

"Any county, city, town, or township may make and enforce within its limits all such local, police, sanitary, and other regulations as are not in conflict with general laws."

Art. XI, § 11. And it is of the utmost consequence in a city subject, as San Francisco is, the greater part of the year to high winds, and composed principally within the limits designated of wooden buildings, that regulations of a strict character should be adopted to prevent the possibility of fires. That occupations in which continuous fires are necessary should cease at certain hours of the night would seem to be under such circumstances a reasonable regulation as a measure of precaution. At any rate, of its necessity for the purpose designated the municipal authorities are the appropriate judges. Their regulations in this matter are not subject to any interference by the federal tribunals unless they are made the occasion for invading the substantial rights of persons, and no such invasion is caused by the regulation in question. As we said in Barbier v Connolly,

"the same municipal authority which directs the cessation of labor must necessarily prescribe the limits within which it shall be enforced, as it does the limits in a city within which wooden buildings cannot be constructed."

No invidious discrimination is made against anyone by the measures adopted. All persons engaged in the same business within the prescribed limits are treated alike and subjected to similar restrictions.

There is no force in the objection that an unwarrantable discrimination is made against persons engaged in the laundry business because persons in other kinds of business are not required to cease from their labors during the same hours at night. There may be no risks attending the business of others -- certainly not as great as where fires are constantly required to carry them on. The specific regulations for one kind of business which may be necessary for the protection of the public can never be the just ground of complaint because like restrictions are not imposed upon other business of a different kind. The discriminations which are open to objection are those where persons engaged in the same business are subjected to different restrictions or are held entitled to different privileges under the same conditions. It is only then that the discrimination can be said to impair that equal right which all can claim in the enforcement of the laws.

But counsel in the court below not only objected to the fourth section of the ordinance as discriminating between those engaged in the laundry business and those engaged in other business, but also as discriminating between different classes engaged in the laundry business itself. This latter ground of objection becomes intelligible only by reference to his brief, in which we are informed that the laundry business, besides the washing and ironing of clothes, involves the fluting, polishing, bluing, and wringing of them, and that these are all different branches, requiring separate and skilled workmen, who are not prohibited from working during the hours of night. This fluting, polishing, bluing, and wringing of clothes, it seems to us, are incidents of the general business and are embraced within its prohibition. But if not incidents, and they are outside of the prohibition, it is because there is not the danger from them that would arise from the continuous fires required in washing, and it is not discriminating legislation in any invidious sense that branches of the same business from which danger is apprehended are prohibited during certain hours of the night, while other branches involving no such danger are permitted.

The objection that the fourth section is void on the ground that it deprives a man of the right to work at all times is equally without force. However broad the right of everyone to follow such calling and employ his time as he may judge most conducive to his interests, it must be exercised subject to such general rules as are adopted by society for the common welfare. All sorts of restrictions are imposed upon the actions of men notwithstanding the liberty which is guaranteed to each. It is liberty regulated by just and impartial laws. Parties, for example, are free to make any contracts they choose for a lawful purpose, but society says what contracts shall be in writing and what may be verbally made, and on what days they may be executed, and how long they may be enforced if their terms are not complied with. So too with the hours of labor. On few subjects has there been more regulation. How many hours shall constitute a day's work in the absence of contract, at what time shops in our cities shall close at night, are constant subjects of legislation. Laws setting aside Sunday as a day of rest are upheld not from any right of the government to legislate for the promotion of religious observances, but from its right to protect all persons from the physical and moral debasement which comes from uninterrupted labor. Such laws have always been deemed beneficent and merciful laws, especially to the poor and dependent, to the laborers in our factories and workshops, and in the heated rooms of our cities, and their validity has been sustained by the highest courts of the states.

The principal objection, however, of the petitioner to the ordinance in question is founded upon the supposed hostile motives of the supervisors in passing it. The petition alleges that it was adopted owing to a feeling of antipathy and hatred prevailing in the City and County of San Francisco against the subjects of the emperor of China resident therein, and for the purpose of compelling those engaged in the laundry business to abandon their lawful vocation and residence there, and not for any sanitary, police, or other legitimate purpose. There is nothing, however, in the language of the ordinance or in the record of its enactment which in any respect tends to sustain this allegation. And the rule is general, with reference to the enactments of all legislative bodies, that the courts cannot inquire into the motives of the legislators in passing them except as they may be disclosed on the face of the acts or inferable from their operation, considered with reference to the condition of the country and existing legislation. The motives of the legislators, considered as to the purposes they had in view, will always be presumed to be to accomplish that which follows as the natural and reasonable effect of their enactments. Their motives, considered as the moral inducements for their votes, will vary with the different members of the legislative body. The diverse character of such motives and the impossibility of penetrating into the hearts of men and ascertaining the truth preclude all such inquiries as impracticable and futile. And in the present case, even if the motives of the supervisors were as alleged, the ordinance would not be thereby changed from a legitimate police regulation unless in its enforcement it is made to operate only against the class mentioned, and of this there is no pretense.

It followed that the several questions certified must be answered in the negative, and the judgment was affirmed, and it is so ordered.
