= Charles Kinsolving =

Charles Kinsolving may refer to:

- Charles J. Kinsolving III (1904–1984), bishop of the Episcopal Diocese of Rio Grande
- Charles Lester Kinsolving (1927–2019), American talk radio host
