= Trelease =

Trealease is a surname. Notable people with the surname include:

- Allen W. Trelease (c. 1928/1929–2011), American historian, author, and professor
- George E. Trelease, namesake of the George E. Trelease Memorial Baseball Park in Springfield, Massachusetts
- Jim Trelease (born 1941), American educator and author
- Richard M. Trelease, Jr. (1921–2005), bishop of the Episcopal Diocese of the Rio Grande
- William Trelease (1857–1945), American botanist, entomologist, and explorer
