= Michael Vono =

American bishop (born 1948)

The Right Reverend Michael Louis Vono
- Bishop of the Rio Grande
- Church: Episcopal Church
- Diocese: Rio Grande
- Elected: April 24, 2010
- In office: 2010-2018
- Predecessor: Jeffrey N. Steenson
- Successor: Michael Buerkel Hunn

Orders
- Ordination: June 26, 1976 (deacon); February 12, 1977 (priest)
- Consecration: October 24, 2010 by Katharine Jefferts Schori

Personal details
- Born: September 15, 1948 (age 77) Providence, Rhode Island, United States
- Denomination: Anglican (prev. Roman Catholic)

Michael Louis Vono (born September 15, 1948) was the ninth bishop of the Episcopal Diocese of Rio Grande.

== Early life and education ==
Vono was born in Providence, Rhode Island, on September 15, 1948, and was raised as a Roman Catholic. He studied for the catholic priesthood at Our Lady of Providence Seminary in Warwick, Rhode Island, and earned a Bachelor of Arts. He then pursued studies at the Catholic University of America and graduated with a Master of Arts in religious and theological studies. After joining the Episcopal Church in 1974, he also resumed training for the priesthood and earned a certificate in Anglican Studies from the Virginia Theological Seminary in 1976. He was also awarded a Doctor of Ministry from Hartford Seminary.

== Ordained ministry ==
Vono was ordained to the diaconate on June 26, 1976, and to the priesthood on February 12, 1977. He became assistant rector of All Saints Church in Worcester, Massachusetts, before being called to Christ Church in Leicester, Massachusetts, in 1980 to serve as its vicar. A month later, the mission church was made into a parish church and he became its first rector. In 1990, he took a sabbatical at the Anglican Centre in Rome. In 1992 he accepted the post of rector of St. Paul's Within the Walls in Rome, Italy, where he remained until 2010.

== Bishop ==
On April 24, 2010, Vono was elected on the third ballot as Bishop of the Rio Grande. He was consecrated on October 24, 2010, with Presiding Bishop Katharine Jefferts Schori as chief consecrator at the Hilton Hotel in Albuquerque, New Mexico. He was then installed at St John's Cathedral on October 24. He remained in office until his retirement on November 3, 2018.

== See also ==
- List of Episcopal bishops of the United States
- Historical list of bishops of the Episcopal Church in the United States of America
