= Barbier v. Connolly =

- Supreme Court of the United States

Submitted November 25, 1884 Decided January 5, 1885
- Full case name: Barbier v. Connolly
- Citations: 113 U.S. 27 (more) 5 S. Ct. 357; 28 L. Ed. 923; 1885 U.S. LEXIS 1647

Holding
- The Fourteenth Amendment of the Constitution does not impair the states' police powers that were reserved to them when the Constitution was ratified.

Court membership
- Chief Justice Morrison Waite Associate Justices Samuel F. Miller · Stephen J. Field; Joseph P. Bradley · John M. Harlan; William B. Woods · Stanley Matthews; Horace Gray · Samuel Blatchford

Case opinion
- Majority: Field, joined by unanimous

Laws applied
- U.S. Const. amend. XIV

Barbier v. Connolly, 113 U.S. 27 (1885), was a United States Supreme Court in which the Court considered the application of the Fourteenth Amendment to the United States Constitution to a San Francisco ordinance regulating the establishment of public laundries. The Court held that the regulation of laundries for public health and public safety reasons were clearly within the police powers of the state, and the Fourteenth Amendment was not meant to interfere with the police powers of the state.

== See also ==
- Soon Hing v. Crowley
