= Episcopal Diocese of the Rio Grande =

Diocese of the Episcopal Church in the United States

Diocese of the Rio Grande Diœcesis Fluminis Grandis

Location
- Country: United States
- Territory: New Mexico and Southwest Texas
- Ecclesiastical province: Province VII

Statistics
- Area: 153,394 sq mi (397,290 km^{2})
- Congregations: 48 (2025)
- Members: 7,565 (2025)

Information
- Denomination: Episcopal Church
- Established: February 10, 1953
- Cathedral: Cathedral of St John

Current leadership
- Bishop: Michael Buerkel Hunn

Map
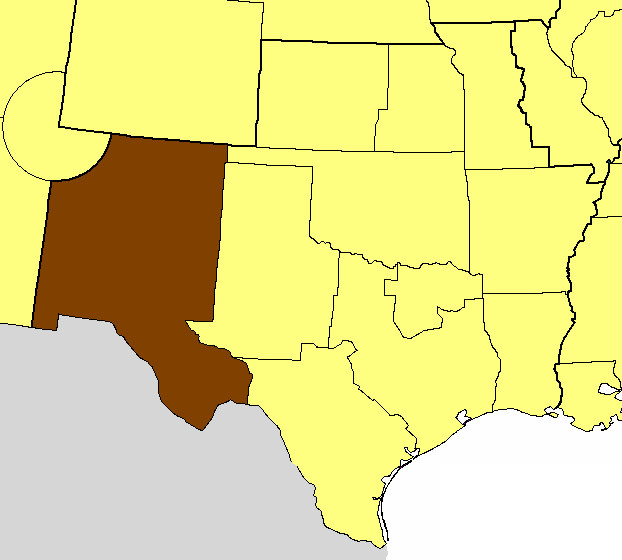
- Location of the Diocese of the Rio Grande

Website
- www.dioceserg.org

The Episcopal Diocese of the Rio Grande is the Episcopal Church's diocese in New Mexico and southwest Texas, the portion of the state west of the Pecos River, including the counties of El Paso, Reeves, Culberson, Jeff Davis, Brewster, Presidio, Terrell, Hudspeth and Pecos. The total area of the diocese is 153,394 square miles (397,290 km^{2}). The see is based in Albuquerque, New Mexico and the diocesan cathedral is the Cathedral Church of St. John.

The diocese reported 10,760 members in 2017 and 7,565 members in 2025. Plate and pledge income for the 48 filing congregations of the diocese in 2024 was $9,763,058. Average Sunday attendance (ASA) in 2025 was 2,893 persons, down from 3,597 in 2015.

== History ==
The 1859 General Convention of the Episcopal Church assigned New Mexico to the jurisdiction of the Missionary District of the Northwest under Joseph Cruickshank Talbot. Talbot first visited the region in 1863, during the abortive attempt by Padre Jose Antonio Martinez of Taos to ally himself and his Roman Catholic congregations with the Episcopal Church.

In 1874, the General Convention of the Episcopal Church approved the formation of the Missionary District of New Mexico and Arizona and appointed William Forbes Adams as Bishop of the new mission. He first traveled to Albuquerque in 1875, when nine people attended the first Episcopal worship service at the Exchange Hotel on the Plaza, on March 4, 1875. Adams resigned in 1877 and was succeeded by George Dunlop, under whose presidency the first convention of the Missionary District of New Mexico and Arizona was held, again at the Exchange Hotel, in 1880. Dunlop is the second diocesan bishop of the region that went on to be known from 1920 as the Missionary District of New Mexico and South West Texas; from 1952 as the Episcopal Diocese of New Mexico and Southwest Texas until 1973. The Diocesan convention presented a memorial to General Convention in Resolution B-135 to change the name to The Diocese of Rio Grande. The House of Bishops determined that no action was required. ['The Diocese of Rio Grande' is not so named in any earlier journal of General Convention.]

The election of Terence Kelshaw in 1989 inaugurated a period of change not unmixed with controversy for the diocese. Kelshaw was a theological conservative and declined to support ventures and projects whether at local, national or international level that were not in alignment with conservative views. He was particularly vocal on the importance of traditional values in matters of sexual morality. Kelshaw gradually withdrew from the life of the national church and, by the time of his retirement, Rio Grande was widely regarded as among the most conservative dioceses in the Episcopal Church. The extent to which Kelshaw's episcopate saw the development of a staunchly conservative approach in a sizable proportion of diocesan life was evident at the convention held to elect his successor, where the nominees included Martyn Minns, the high-profile conservative Rector of Truro Church (Fairfax, Virginia) who would go on, in June 2006, to be elected Missionary Bishop of the Convocation of Anglicans in North America (CANA), a missionary initiative of the Anglican Church of Nigeria primarily comprising congregations that have disaffiliated from the Episcopal Church. The Anglican realignment came to the Diocese of the Rio Grande in 2007, when St. Clement's, the diocese's oldest and largest parish and its pro-cathedral, voted to leave and pay a settlement. Four other congregations left around the same time.

Steenson shared his predecessor's theological conservatism, though unlike Kelshaw, he came from an Anglo-Catholic background. He voiced repeated and increasing concern about the direction of the Episcopal Church, and ultimately determined he should resign his position and orders, and become a Roman Catholic. He resigned in September 2007, and was subsequently received into the Roman Catholic Church. He has since been ordained deacon in December 2008 by Cardinal Bernard Francis Law, the archpriest of the Basilica of St. Mary Major in Rome, and priest in February 2009, by Archbishop Michael J. Sheehan of Santa Fe. Steenson was a faculty member at the University of St. Thomas (Texas) and at St. Mary’s Seminary in Houston, Texas, and is now a faculty member at University of St. Thomas (Minnesota) and at the Saint Paul Seminary School of Divinity in Saint Paul, Minnesota. In 2012 Steenson was made the founding Ordinary for the Personal Ordinariate of the Chair of Saint Peter for former Anglicans seeking corporate reunion with the Roman Catholic Church.

Following Steenson's resignation, ecclesiastical authority in the diocese passed to the Standing Committee, which since March 2008 has been assisted by William C. Frey, retired Bishop of Guatemala and Colorado, who was appointed assisting bishop pending the election of a new diocesan. Concurrently with Frey's appointment, the Standing Committee also announced that the 8th Bishop, Terence Kelshaw, had joined the Anglican Church of Uganda.

The departure from the Episcopal Church of the two previous bishops was a blow from which recovery seems certain to be slow. Following a lengthy period of consultation, an election convention was held on April 24, 2010, and elected Michael Louis Vono, then rector of St. Paul's Within the Walls, Rome, Italy, as tenth bishop of the Episcopal Diocese of the Rio Grande. After receiving the required consents, he received his episcopal ordination on October 22, 2010.

On May 2, 2018 the Rev. Canon Michael Buerkel-Hunn was elected to be the 11th bishop of the Episcopal Diocese of the Rio Grande. Buerkel-Hunn had previously been serving as Canon to the Presiding Bishop for Ministry Within The Episcopal Church.

== Bishops of the Rio Grande ==
	Style and Name	Dates
1st	William Forbes Adams	1875 - 1877
2nd	George Kelly Dunlop	1881 – 1888
3rd	John Mills Kendrick	1889 – 1911
4th	Frederick Bingham Howden	1914 – 1940
5th	James Moss Stoney	1942 – 1956
6th	Charles J. Kinsolving III	1956 – 1972 (Bishop Coadjutor 1956)
7th	Richard M. Trelease, Jr.	1972 – 1988 (Bishop Coadjutor 1971-1972)
8th	Terence Kelshaw	1989 – 2004
9th	Jeffrey Neil Steenson	2004 – 2007
10th	Michael Vono	2010 – 2018
11th	Michael Buerkel Hunn	2018 – Present
