= James M. Stoney =

Episcopal prelate of the Rio Grande (1888–1965)

The Right Reverend James Moss Stoney
- Bishop of New Mexico and Southwest Texas
- Church: Episcopal Church
- Diocese: New Mexico and Southwest Texas
- Elected: February 1942
- In office: 1942-1956
- Predecessor: Frederick Bingham Howden
- Successor: Charles J. Kinsolving III

Orders
- Ordination: June 4, 1914 by William A. Guerry
- Consecration: April 16, 1942 by Henry St. George Tucker

Personal details
- Born: February 26, 1888 Camden, South Carolina, United States
- Died: July 19, 1965 (aged 77) Albuquerque, New Mexico, United States
- Buried: Sunset Memorial Park, Albuquerque
- Denomination: Anglican
- Parents: James Moss Stoney Jr & Jeannie Johnson Shannon
- Spouse: Mary Clifton Roberts (m. 1915; died 1924) Nora Louise Green (m. 1926)
- Children: 3
- Education: University of the South

James Moss Stoney III (February 26, 1888 – July 19, 1965) was an Episcopal prelate who served as Bishop of New Mexico and Southwest Texas from 1942 to 1956.

== Early life and education ==
Stoney was born on February 26, 1888, in Camden, South Carolina, to the Reverend James Moss Stoney Jr and Jeannie Johnson Shannon. He was the third generation in his family to become a priest, after his father and grandfather. He was educated at public schools and then moved on to study at the University of Georgia between 1904 and 1905. He left to study at the University of the South from which he graduated with a Bachelor of Arts in 1911 and a Bachelor of Divinity in 1913. While there, he was an All-Southern guard for the football team. He was later an assistant coach for The Citadel. He married Mary Clifton Roberts (1893-1924) on April 7, 1915, and together they had three children. After being widowed, Stoney married Nora Louise Green (1919-1998) on February 16, 1926.

== Ordained ministry ==
Stoney was ordained deacon on June 23, 1913, and then priest on June 4, 1914, by Bishop William A. Guerry of South Carolina. He served as rector of Christ Church in Charleston, South Carolina, between 1913 and 1916, and then curate at St John's Church in Savannah, Georgia, from 1916 to 1917. Between 1917 and 1921 he served at Holy Trinity Church in Clemson, South Carolina, and St Paul's Church in Pendleton, South Carolina, with the exception of the period between 1918 and 1919 when he served as a chaplain of the American Expeditionary Forces. In 1921 he became rector of Grace Church in Anniston, Alabama, where he remained until 1942. While at Grace Church he established three missions.

== Episcopacy ==
In February 1942, the House of Bishops meeting in Jacksonville, Florida, elected Stoney as Missionary Bishop of New Mexico and Southwest Texas. He was consecrated on April 16, 1942, in the Church of St Michael and All Angels, Anniston, Alabama, with Presiding Bishop Henry St. George Tucker as chief consecrator. In 1952, the missionary district became a diocese and he became the first diocesan bishop of New Mexico and Southwest Texas. He retired in 1956 and died on July 19, 1965, in Albuquerque, New Mexico.
