= George Kelly Dunlop =

American missionary bishop (1830–1888)

The Right Reverend George Kelly Dunlop S.T.D.
- Missionary Bishop of Arizona and New Mexico
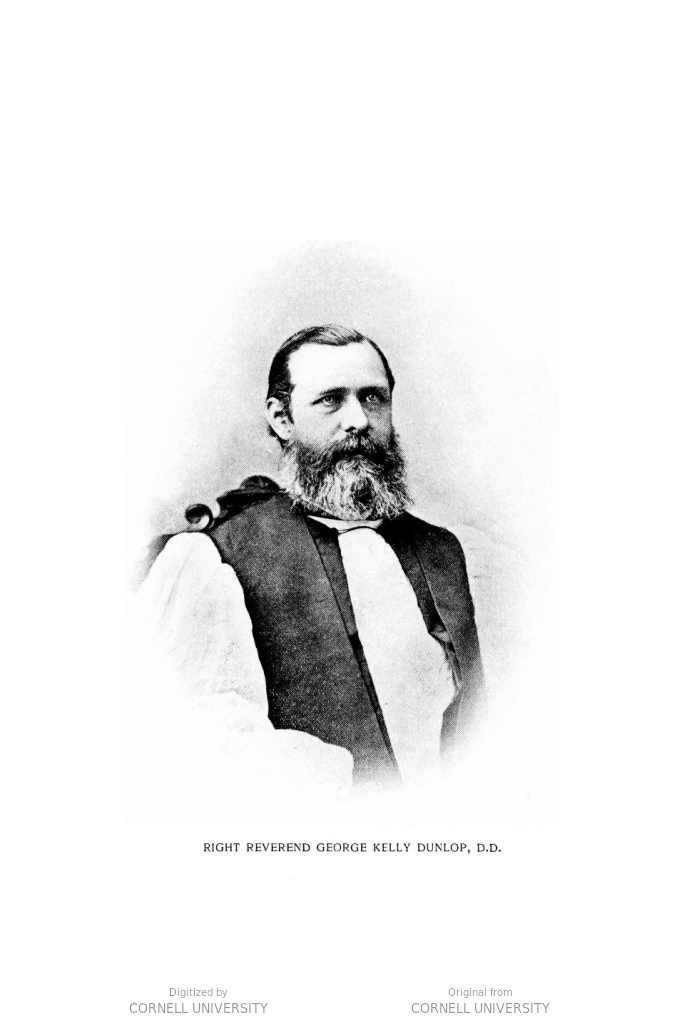
- Church: Episcopal Church
- Diocese: Arizona and New Mexico
- In office: 1880–1888
- Predecessor: John Franklin Spalding
- Successor: Miles Kendrick

Orders
- Ordination: August 7, 1856 by Cicero Stephens Hawks
- Consecration: November 21, 1880 by Henry Benjamin Whipple

Personal details
- Born: November 10, 1830 County Tyrone, Ireland
- Died: March 12, 1880 (aged 49) Las Cruces, New Mexico, United States
- Buried: St. Paul's Memorial Episcopal Church and Guild Hall
- Denomination: Anglican
- Spouse: Mary Wickham Cobb
- Children: 7

George Kelly Dunlop (November 10, 1830 – March 12, 1888) was missionary bishop for the Episcopal Church's Missionary District of New Mexico and Arizona from 1880 to 1888.

== Early life and education ==
Dunlop was born on November 19, 1830, in County Tyrone, Ireland, son of Robert Dunlop and Margaret Kelly, both of whom were of Scottish descent. He studied at the Royal School Dungannon and later at Queen's University of Ireland, from where he graduated in 1852. He arrived in the United States in October 1852. He was awarded a Doctor of Sacred Theology from Racine College in 1880.

== Ordained ministry ==
Dunlop was made deacon on December 4, 1854, in Palmyra, Missouri, and later ordained priest on August 7, 1856, in St John's Church in St. Louis, Missouri, on both occasions by Bishop Cicero Stephens Hawks of Missouri. He served as missionary deacon in St. Charles, Missouri, between 1854 and 1856. Later he became rector of Christ Church in Lexington, Missouri, and in 1864 rector of Grace Church in Kirkwood, Missouri, till 1880. He also served as dean of the St Louis Convocation of the Diocese of Missouri and deputy to the General Convention of 1871, 1877 and 1880.

== Bishop ==
Dunlop was elected Missionary Bishop of Arizona and New Mexico in 1880 and consecrated on November 21, 1880, by Bishop Henry Benjamin Whipple of Minnesota in Christ Church, St. Louis. He assumed his duties on March 21, 1881. He died in office due to pneumonia on March 12, 1888.

== Family ==
Dunlop married Mary Wickham Cobb on July 23, 1857, and they had seven children.

== See also ==
- Episcopal Diocese of Arizona
- Episcopal Diocese of the Rio Grande
