= Wallace John Gardner =

American bishop (1883–1954)

The Right Reverend Wallace John Gardner D.D., S.T.D.
- Bishop of New Jersey
- Church: Episcopal Church
- Diocese: New Jersey
- Elected: March 10, 1936
- In office: 1937–1954
- Predecessor: Paul Matthews
- Successor: Alfred L. Banyard
- Previous post: Coadjutor Bishop of New Jersey (1936-1937)

Orders
- Ordination: June 2, 1912 by Frederick Burgess
- Consecration: June 3, 1936 by Paul Matthews

Personal details
- Born: July 25, 1883 Buffalo, New York, United States
- Died: October 22, 1954 (aged 71) Trenton, New Jersey, United States
- Buried: St. Mary's Episcopal Church, Burlington, New Jersey
- Denomination: Anglican
- Parents: Frederick A. Gardner & Sarah Jane McConnell

Wallace John Gardner (July 25, 1883 – October 22, 1954) was the sixth bishop of New Jersey in The Episcopal Church.

== Biography ==
Gardner was born on July 25, 1883, in Buffalo, New York, the son of Frederick A. Gardner and Sarah Jane McConnell and the fourth of five children. He was educated in Catskill, New York and later at St Stephen's College in Annandale-on-Hudson, New York from where he graduated in 1906 with a Bachelor of Arts. He then worked as a teacher in private schools between 1906 and 1908, after which he became a student at the General Theological Seminary in New York City. He received his Master of Arts from St Stephen's in 1910 and his Doctor of Divinity in 1923. he was awarded a Doctor of Sacred Theology from General in 1937, Rutgers University in 1938 and Philadelphia Divinity School in 1939.

He was ordained deacon in 1911 and priest in 1912. After his diaconal ordination he became chaplain of St Mary and St Paul Cathedral school in Garden City, New York. In 1919 he became rector of St Paul's Church in Flatbush, Brooklyn and then vicar of the Chapel of the Intercession in New York City in 1933. In 1936 he was elected Bishop Coadjutor of New Jersey and was consecrated on June 3, 1936. On November 1, 1937, he succeeded as diocesan bishop. He remained bishop till his death in 1954.
