= T. S. Matthews =

American journalist (1901–1991)

Thomas Stanley Matthews
- Born: January 16, 1901; Cincinnati, Ohio, U.S.
- Died: January 4, 1991 (aged 89); Cavendish, Suffolk, England
- Education: Princeton University (B.A., 1922); New College, Oxford (B.A., 1925)
- Occupations: Editor, journalist, author
- Years active: 1926–1985
- Employer: Time
- Known for: Editor at Time magazine
- Predecessor: Henry Luce
- Spouses: Juliana Stevens Cuyler (m. 1925; death 1949) Martha Gellhorn (m. 1954; div. 1963): Pamela Firth Peniakoff
- Children: 4
- Parent(s): Paul Clement Matthews; Elsie Procter
- Relatives: Stanley Matthews (paternal grandfather)

Thomas Stanley Matthews (January 16, 1901 – January 4, 1991) was an American magazine editor, journalist, and writer. He served as editor of Time magazine from 1949 to 1953.

== Background ==
Thomas Stanley Matthews was born on January 16, 1901, in Cincinnati, Ohio. His father was New Jersey bishop Paul Clement Matthews; and his mother was Elsie Procter, the Procter & Gamble heiress. His grandfather was Stanley Matthews, U.S. senator from Ohio and associate justice of the U.S. Supreme Court. He had five sisters, including Margaret (later Flinsch) and Dorothea (later Dooling).

He earned a first bachelor's degree from Princeton University in 1922 and a second from New College at Oxford University in 1925.

== Career ==
He joined the staff of The New Republic in 1925. There, literary critic Edmund Wilson encouraged him to write for the magazine. By 1928, he became an assistant editor and by 1929 an associate editor.

He joined Time in 1929 as book editor and moved up to assistant managing editor, executive editor, and managing editor. (In 1940, William Saroyan cites him as one of two managing editors at Time, with Manfred Gottfried.) Finally, he succeeded Time co-founder Henry Luce as the magazine's editor, serving in that position from 1949 to 1953.

Matthews' relationship with Time soured over the 1952 presidential election. Luce favored Republican nominee Dwight D. Eisenhower but Matthews preferred his Democratic rival (and his Princeton classmate) Adlai Stevenson II. At Luce's instigation, Matthews moved to England to study a British version of Time. When the project did not carry through, he remained in Britain. There, he wrote numerous books and poetry, including an autobiography and a book on T. S. Eliot. He also reviewed books for The New York Times.

== Impact ==
The New York Times credited Matthews with "bringing depth and refinement to the news weekly in a 25-year career." It described him as a "lean, athletic editor" whose "clipped, quiet speech was filled with obscure literary references" and rid the magazine of its double-barreled adjectives, puns and backward sentences." Whittaker Chambers, who started after and ended before Matthews at Time, summarized as follows: "T. S. Matthews' contribution to the humanity of Time, both in the intellectual and personal sense of the word, cannot be overstated."

However, W.A. Swanberg, author of the Pulitzer Prize-winning biography Luce and His Empire, criticized Matthews for emphasizing the readability of Time at the expense of objectivity. "For him to be managing editor of America's most politically oriented and propagandist 'newsmagazine' was as if F. Scott Fitzgerald were Secretary of State," Swanberg wrote. Swanberg also characterized Matthews as being "as close to being politically obtuse as such an otherwise cultivated man could be."

Princeton University holds his papers, which include writings, notebooks, correspondence, files from Time (1940s, 1950s, including the Time-in-Britain project), subject files, legal and financial correspondence, photographs, and printed material from 1910 to 1991. These include datebooks 1950–1991. Correspondents include John W. Aldridge, Whittaker Chambers, T. S. Eliot, Valerie Eliot, Robert Graves, Eleanor Green, Laura (Riding) Jackson, Schuyler Jackson, Len Lye, Laurie Lee, William Piel Jr., V. S. Pritchett, Lyman Spitzer, and Adlai Stevenson.

== Private life and death ==
Matthews was married three times, to: Juliana Stevens Cuyler, Martha Gellhorn, and Pamela Firth Peniakoff. He married Gellhorn in 1954 and lived with her in London; they divorced in 1963. He had four sons: Thomas S. Matthews Jr., John P. C. Matthews, Paul C. Matthews, and W. A. P. (Alexander) Matthews.

He died of lung cancer in Cavendish, England.

== Works ==
The Library of Congress holds the following books by Matthews:

- To the Gallows I Must Go (1931)
- Sugar Pill: An Essay on Newspapers (1957, 1959)
- Name and Address: An Autobiography (1960, 1961)
- O My America! Notes on a Trip (1962)
- Great Tom: Notes Towards the Definition of T. S. Eliot (1974)
- Jacks or Better: A Narrative (1977)
- Under the Influence: Recollections of Robert Graves, Laura Riding, and Friends (1979, 1983)
- Angels Unawares: Twentieth-Century Portraits (1985)

Articles appearing online include:

- "Football Morals" (November 26, 1976)

Poems appearing online include:

- "After Such Knowledge: T.S. Eliot" (undated)

== See also ==
- Time
- The New Republic
- Henry Luce
- Martha Gellhorn
- Whittaker Chambers
