= Zenaida and Philonella =

Eastern Orthodox saints

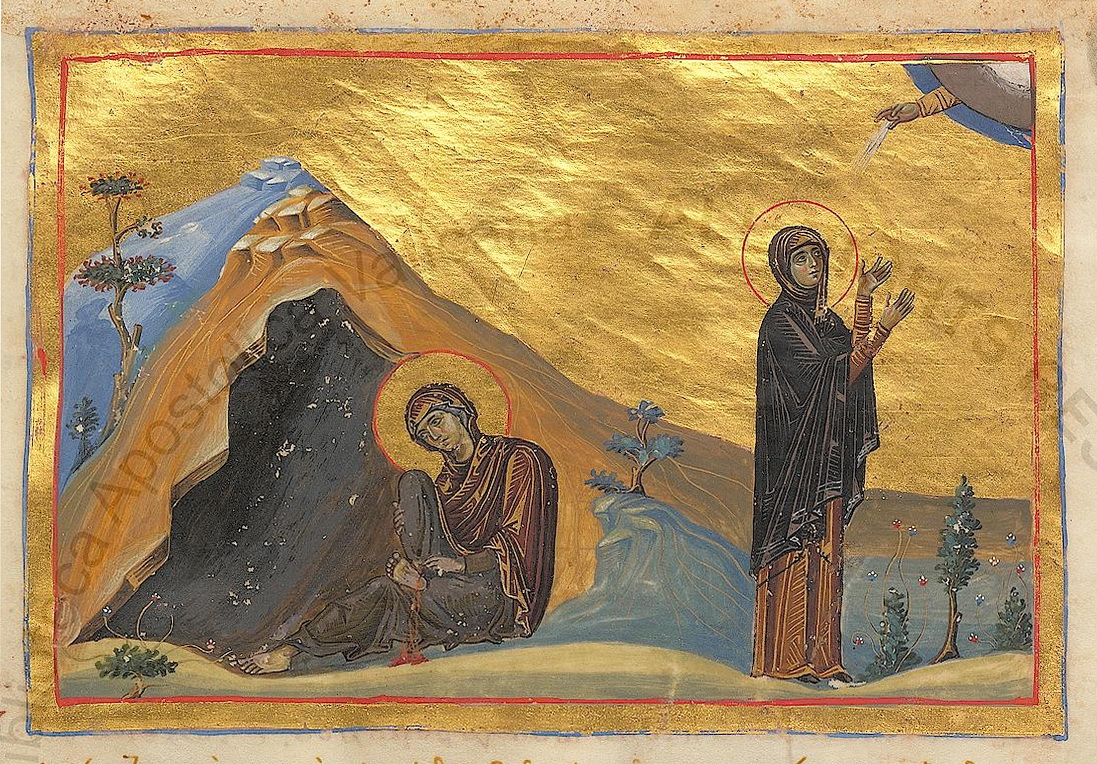

Unmercenary healers, martyrs
- Born: Tarsus, Cilicia (modern-day Tarsus, Mersin, Turkey)
- Died: c. 100 near Demetriada, Thessaly (modern-day Greece)
- Venerated in: Eastern Orthodoxy; Anglican Communion
- Feast: October 11 (Eastern Orthodox); April 14 (Episcopal Church)

Saints Zenaida (Zenaida of Tarsus) and Philonella (d. circa 100) were traditionally the first Christian physicians after Luke the Evangelist, and the first "unmercenaries" (physicians who would not accept fees from their patients). They are particularly venerated in Eastern Christianity.

Zenaida and Philonella were sisters, born into a well-educated Jewish family and said to be cousins of Paul the Apostle. They were instructed and baptized into the Christian faith by their brother Jason, who was bishop of their native city of Tarsus. On entering the philosophical academy at Tarsus, they devoted themselves to the study of medicine, and when they completed their studies moved to the mountains around Pelion near Demetriada in Thessaly. This was a region renowned for its healing springs and shrines to Asclepius. The physicians who practiced there catered to the wealthy, charging exorbitant amounts for their services, and augmented their incomes with the sale of magical amulets and charms.

The sisters set themselves in opposition to the prevailing custom. On locating a cave with a mineral spring, they set up a chapel and cells for themselves, and opened a clinic where they treated all who came to them regardless of their ability to pay.

Philonella devoted herself to experimental medicine, using methods approaching that of modern scientific methods, and worked hard to separate effective medicine from superstition. Zenaida was particularly interested in pediatrics. Toward the end of her life she paid particular attention to the treatment of psychiatric disorders, including clinical depression. Both sisters devoted their lives to prayer when they were not working in their clinic.

Traditions vary about their deaths. According to one account, the two were stoned to death by pagans on the same night. According to another, both met peaceful ends, with Philonella surviving her sister by some years, deepening her spiritual devotion and becoming known as a wonderworker.

They are commemorated on October 11 in Eastern Orthodoxy and on April 14 with Hermione of Ephesus in the Episcopal Church.

The name of Zenaida is derived from the Greek: Ζηναις, Zenais, "of Zeus". Her becoming a Christian in general and a venerated saint in particular assured this name's continued use in Christian countries, its pagan origin forgotten.
