= Jeffrey N. Steenson =

American Catholic prelate (born 1952)

The Reverend Monsignor Jeffrey N. Steenson PA
- Ordinary emeritus of the Personal Ordinariate of the Chair of Saint Peter
- Appointed: January 1, 2012
- Installed: February 12, 2012
- Term ended: November 24, 2015
- Successor: Steven Joseph Lopes

Orders
- Ordination: June 29, 1980 (Episcopalian); February 21, 2009 (Catholic) by Michael J. Sheehan
- Consecration: January 16, 2005 (Episcopalian)

Personal details
- Born: April 1, 1952 (age 74) Fort Rucker, Alabama
- Denomination: Catholic
- Spouse: Debra Jane Steenson
- Children: 3

Jeffrey Neil Steenson PA (born April 1, 1952) is an American retired priest and prelate of the Catholic Church and a former bishop of the Episcopal Church within the Anglican Communion. Steenson was the first ordinary of the Personal Ordinariate of the Chair of Saint Peter which was established for former Anglicans who have become Catholics. He was previously the bishop of the Episcopal Diocese of the Rio Grande from 2005 to 2007, when he resigned and was received into full communion with the Catholic Church.

== Education ==
Steenson earned a B.A. from Trinity International University in 1974, an M.A. in church history from Trinity Evangelical Divinity School in 1976, and an M.Div. from Harvard Divinity School in 1978. He went on to earn a D.Phil. from the University of Oxford in 1983 with a dissertation entitled "Basil of Ancyra and the Course of Nicene Orthodoxy".

== Episcopal Church ministry ==
Steenson was ordained as a priest of the Episcopal Church on June 29, 1980, and became a curate at All Saints', Wynnewood, Pennsylvania, and later the rector of the Church of the Good Shepherd in Rosemont, Pennsylvania, and then St. Andrew's Church in Fort Worth, Texas.

In October 2004, Steenson was elected coadjutor bishop of the diocese of the Rio Grande. He was consecrated on January 16, 2005. On August 1, 2005, he succeeded Terrence Kelshaw as Bishop of Rio Grande. Steenson was a member of the Board of Trustees of Nashotah House and the Board of Directors of The Living Church Foundation.

In September 2007, Steenson announced his decision to resign as bishop, effective December 1.

== Catholic ministry ==
Steenson was received into the full communion of the Catholic Church on December 1, 2007. Having petitioned for ordination in the Catholic Church under the Pastoral Provision, he began studies at the Pontifical Irish College in Rome.

Steenson was ordained a transitional deacon on December 13, 2008, by Cardinal Bernard Law, the archpriest of the Basilica of St. Mary Major in Rome. On February 21, 2009, he was ordained a priest for the Archdiocese of Santa Fe by Archbishop Michael J. Sheehan, at St. Thomas Aquinas Church in Rio Rancho, New Mexico.

Steenson has taught at the University of Dallas (Rome campus), the University of St. Thomas, and St. Mary's Seminary, both in Houston.

On January 1, 2012, Pope Benedict XVI named Steenson the first ordinary of the newly created Personal Ordinariate of the Chair of Saint Peter. He was installed as an ordinary on February 12, 2012. Upon his appointment as ordinary, Steenson was granted the title protonotary apostolic, the highest rank of monsignor, by Pope Benedict XVI. Being married, Steenson is not eligible to be consecrated a Catholic bishop due to his marriage. However, in his position as ordinary, he was a full voting member of the United States Conference of Catholic Bishops. At its founding, the ordinariate was said to have inquiries from over 100 Anglican priests and 1,400 people. Steenson resigned from the office of ordinary on November 24, 2015. His successor, Bishop Steven J. Lopes, was appointed on the same day.

After resigning from the office of ordinary, Steenson began teaching at the Saint Paul Seminary School of Divinity. He was the scholar-in-residence for two years, teaching classes on patristics and holy orders, as well as serving as a formation director. He retired from this position in 2018.

== Personal life ==
Steenson is married to Debra Jane Steenson, with whom he has three adult children. He is an amateur pilot and aircraft builder.

== See also ==
- Historical list of bishops of the Episcopal Church in the United States of America
- List of the Catholic bishops of the United States#Personal Ordinariate of the Chair of Saint Peter

Episcopal Church (USA) titles
Preceded by Terence Kelshaw	Bishop of Rio Grande; 2004–2007	Succeeded by Michael Vono
Catholic Church titles
New title	Ordinary of the Personal Ordinariate of the Chair of Saint Peter; 2012–2015	Succeeded by Steven Joseph Lopes as Bishop
