= Hermione of Ephesus =

Christian martyr

Saint Hermione of Ephesus
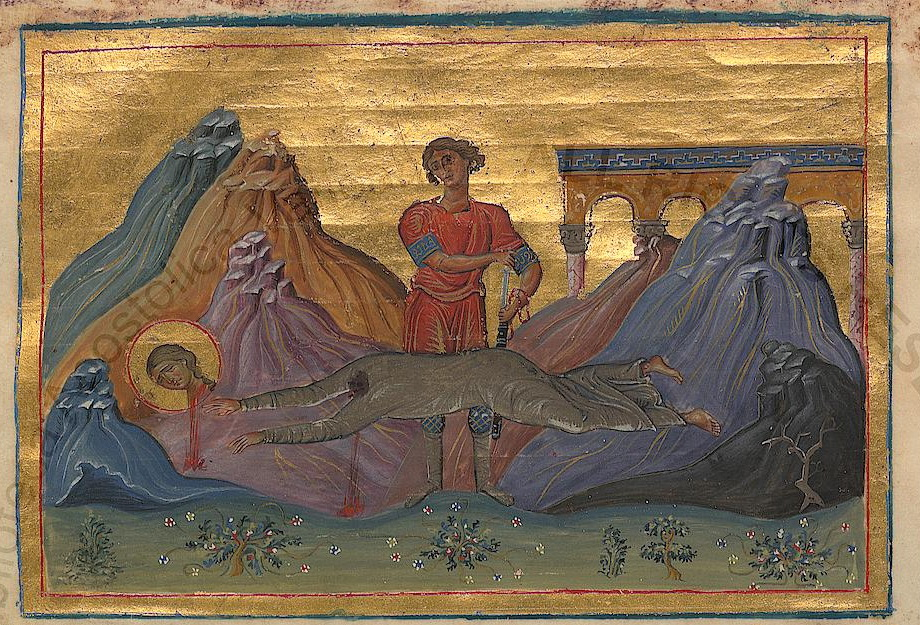
- Beheading of St. Hermione. Miniature from the Menologion of Basil II, c. 11th century

Unmercenary Healer and Virgin martyr
- Born: Caesarea
- Died: A.D. 117; Rome
- Venerated in: Eastern Orthodox Church; Catholic Church; Anglican Communion
- Canonized: Pre-Congregation
- Feast: 4 September (Eastern Orthodox and Roman Catholic); 14 April (Episcopalian)

Hermione of Ephesus (Greek: Ερμιόνη της Εφέσου; d. A.D. 117) is a 2nd-century saint and martyr venerated by the Eastern Orthodox Church and Catholic Church. She was well known as a "great healer" and founded the first Christian hospital in Ephesus.

== Biography ==
Hermione was born in Caesarea and was one of the four daughters of Saint Philip the Evangelist, one of the seven deacons as described in chapter 6 in the Acts of the Apostles, (Note: Acts 6:1–6) chosen by the early Christian church to minister to the community of believers in Jerusalem. Her name does not appear in the Bible, but she and her sisters are described as virgins and "gifted with prophecy". (Note: Acts 21:8–9) Hermione also appears in the Menaion, the liturgical book used by the Eastern Orthodox Church. She is often confused with a daughter of St. Philip the Apostle. (Note: Dunbar, Agnes Baillie Cunninghame (1904). A Dictionary of Saintly Women. Vol. 1. London: George Bell & Sons. p. 380. ISBN 978-0-7222-1729-0. OCLC 880599478. OL 25896938M – via Google Books.)

According to tradition, around the early 100s, after studying medicine, Hermione travelled with her sister Eukhilda to Ephesus, through Anatolia, to meet St. John the Theologian in the hopes that they could help him in his evangelization efforts. They found that he had already died, but met Petronius, a disciple of Paul the Apostle, and followed him instead. Hermione became well known for her healing and built a hospital in Ephesus. Soon, her reputation as a doctor and as a devout Christian attracted the attention of the Roman emperor Trajan who stopped in Ephesus on his way to a war with the Persians in 114 to convince her to renounce Christ. When she refused, he ordered that she be struck in the face for several hours, which she was able to withstand because she was "comforted by a vision of the Lord, in the form of Petronius, sitting upon the throne of judgment." Trajan freed her when he saw that she would not recant her faith and that she bore the torture with "patience and courage," and after she prophesied that he would defeat the Persians and that his son-in-law Hadrian would succeed him.

Hadrian also tried to force Hermione to renounce Christ, by having her scourged and her feet pierced with wire but "she endured these trials without complaint." Hadrian also ordered that Hermione be thrown into a cauldron full of burning tar; she made the Sign of the Cross before entering and was unharmed. The fire was extinguished after she entered the cauldron and she "seemed to be standing in dew." Hadrian touched the cauldron himself, but his nails fell off and he was badly burned, so he ordered his troops to "torture her without mercy;" they beat her and cut her feet with nails. They tried to fry her to death in an enormous pan, but a moment after she was tossed naked onto the pan, the fire under the pan exploded, burning several onlookers. After these miracles, Hermione pretended to want to sacrifice to idols and was taken to a pagan temple. Khoury reported that she prayed and "caused the jeweled idols in Hadrian’s pagan temple to go crashing down into ruins," so he had her beheaded. Before she died, her two executioners, named Theotimus and Theodulos, were briefly paralysed. They knelt at her feet and were converted to Christianity "on the spot." She healed them and promised that they would go to heaven, and they died soon afterwards. According to Khoury, Hermione "owns a special place among the Palestine saints — the place reserved for valiant women of unbreakable faith in Jesus Christ."

Hermione might have been buried at the eastern slopes of Pion Hill in Ephesus, along with an impressive list of other saints, including Mary Magdalene, Saint Timothy, her father Saint Philip, Paul of Thebes, Aristobulus, Adauctus, and Adauctus’ daughter, Callisthena, although "there is no archeological evidence to support even one sacred burial from the list."

== Veneration ==
Hermione's feast day is 4 September except in the Episcopal Church, where she is honored on 14 April with Zenaida and Philonella.
