= Adelaide Teague Case =

Episcopal educator and saint

- Born: January 1, 1887; St. Louis, Missouri
- Hometown: Bronxville, New York
- Died: June 19, 1948 (aged 61); Boston, Massachusetts
- Venerated in: Episcopal Church (United States)
- Canonized: 2022
- Feast: June 19

Adelaide Teague Case (January 1, 1887 – June 19, 1948) was an American educator who is recognized on the calendar of saints of the Episcopal Church.

== Biography ==
Case was born in Missouri but her family moved her to New York in her infancy. She attended Bryn Mawr College, worked as librarian in the Episcopal Church's national headquarters, and taught at the New York Training School for Deaconesses.

She completed her Ph.D. at Columbia University and immediately began teaching at the Teachers' College there. She taught there from 1919 to 1941, becoming a professor and head of the department of religious education.

Case traveled the country as a speaker. She lectured on educational topics and was popular with audiences of different religions.

In 1941, Case left Columbia to become Professor of Christian Education at the Episcopal Theological School in Cambridge, Massachusetts. She was the first woman to teach as a professor there full time. She taught at Episcopal Theological School until her death in Boston on June 19, 1948.

== Progressive Education ==
Case's book, Liberal Christianity and Religious Education, grew out of her dissertation at Columbia. She believed there was a disconnect between the values of Christianity and the way it was taught to children. She wrote about, studied, and advocated for progressive education, which she saw as centered on the child instead of on the teacher. She took some of the methods popularized by John Dewey and applied them to religious education.

She advocated for an approach that applied the Bible and Christian tradition to a child's particular life and the society they lived in. She wrote in Liberal Christianity, "We need to know, not simply to guess, the information and attitudes of religious workers on such matters as: the use of the Bible in modern life, facts about the life of Jesus, the importance of religious dogmas, standards of sex relationship, war and peace, the organization and control of industry, property ownership, freedom of speech."

== Liberal Christianity ==
Case was part of the liberal catholic branch of Anglicanism, which combined progressive interpretations and social activism of the Bible with traditional practice. She joined the Society of the Companions of the Holy Cross in 1915, and remained a member through her life.

Case was an activist on many fronts. A member of the Episcopal Pacifist Fellowship, she helped lead the Children's Peace Festival in 1936 and Educators Against the Peacetime Draft in 1940. When the government began sending people of Japanese descent to internment camps during World War II, Case housed Japanese students. She also worked with the American Jewish Congress, the Riverside Colored Orphanage and the National Y.W.C.A. and was a member of the National Council of the Episcopal Church from 1946 to 1948.

She promoted women's ordination and preached frequently in the chapel at Episcopal Theological School. The school did not admit women into their graduate program at the time. Case found loopholes to teach students anyway while continuing to push against the policy.

While teaching at Episcopal Theological School, Case opened up her house to student families and helped members of minority groups who didn't have homes.

== Veneration ==
In 2009, Adelaide Teague Case was included on a trial calendar for the Episcopal Church, with a feast day of July 19.

That calendar was never adopted. In 2018, her feast was again adopted on a trial basis. This time her feast day was June 19, the day of her death.

In 2022, Case was officially added to the Episcopal Church liturgical calendar with her feast day on June 19.

== Bibliography ==
- Liberal Christianity and Religious Education (1924)
- As Modern Writers See Jesus (1927)
- Seven Psalms (1935)
- The Servant of the Lord (1940)
