= Holy Unmercenaries =

Title of some saints in the Orthodox Church

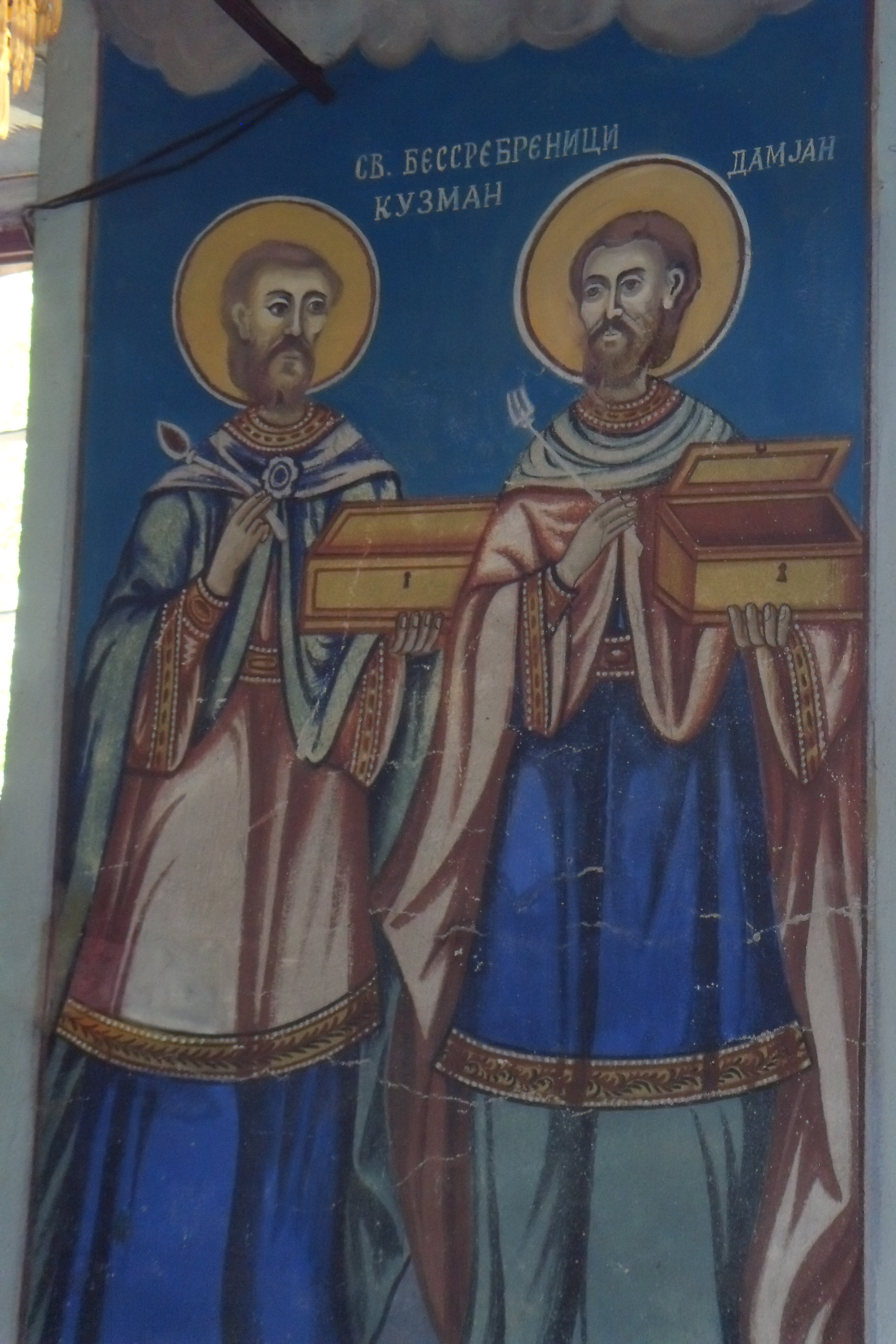
Icon of the Holy Unmercenaries, Saints Cosmas and Damian in Dobrošte, Tearce Municipality, North Macedonia

Holy Unmercenaries (Greek: Άγιοι Ανάργυροι, romanized: Agioi Anárgyroi) is an epithet applied to a number of Christian saints who did not accept payment for good deeds. These include Christian healers or physicians who, in conspicuous opposition to medical practice of the day, tended to the sick, free of charge.

== List of Holy Unmercenaries ==
Saints bearing this title include:

- Zenaida and Philonella (c. 100)
- Saint Tryphon (c. 250)
- Saint Thalelaeus the Unmercenary, at Anazarbus in Cilicia (284)
- Saints Cosmas and Damian of Mesopotamia (c. 303)
- Saint Pantaleon (c. 305), also called Saint Panteleimon
- Saints Cyrus and John (c. 304)
- Saint Diomedes of Tarsus (c. 311)
- Saint Blaise (316)
- Saint Sampson the Hospitable (c. 530)
- Saint Agapetus of the Kiev Caves (1095)
- Saint Matrona Nikonova (1952)
- Saint Luke the Surgeon of Crimea (1961)
- Saint Hermione (c. 117)

== See also ==
- List of Eastern Orthodox saint titles
- List of Eastern Orthodox saints
