= Miles Kendrick =

American bishop (1836–1911)

The Right Reverend John Mills Kendrick D.D.
- Missionary Bishop of New Mexico
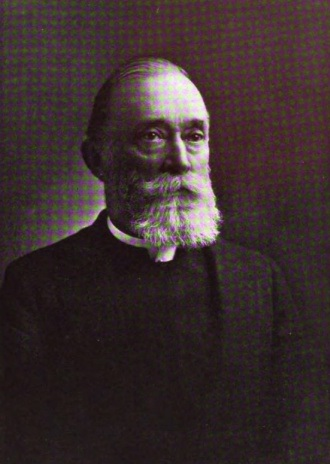
- Church: Episcopal Church
- Diocese: New Mexico
- In office: 1889–1911
- Predecessor: George Kelly Dunlop
- Successor: Frederick Bingham Howden
- Previous posts: Missionary Bishop of Arizona and New Mexico (1889-1910)

Orders
- Ordination: June 28, 1865 by Charles Pettit McIlvaine
- Consecration: January 18, 1889 by Daniel S. Tuttle

Personal details
- Born: May 14, 1836 Gambier, Ohio, United States
- Died: December 16, 1911 (aged 75) Oceanside, California, United States
- Denomination: Anglican
- Parents: John Kendrick & Julia Guitteau
- Spouse: Sarah H. Allen

John Mills Kendrick (May 14, 1836 – December 16, 1911) was an Episcopal Church bishop, educator, and Civil War Officer of the United States.

== Life ==
Consecrated on January 18, 1889, in Trinity Church, Columbus, Ohio as Missionary Bishop of Arizona and New Mexico, an area he served from 1889 to 1910. From 1910 till 1911 he served as the Missionary Bishop of New Mexico only.

John Mills Kendrick was born at Gambier, Ohio on May 14. 1836. His parents were John and Julia (Guitteau) Kendrick. Growing up in Ohio, his father was professor at Kenyon and Marietta Colleges and he graduated from Marietta College in 1856. Initially, he studied law and was admitted to the NY bar but returned to Ohio to enter the Theological School at Marietta, Ohio. At the outbreak of the Civil War in 1861, he left the seminary for two years, serving in the Federal Army where he was quickly promoted from private to captain. Using his law education he served as an assistant adjutant-general. Returning to Ohio in 1863, he graduated in the seminary class of 1864, he was ordained to the diaconate in the seminary chapel, May 31, 1864, by Bishop Mcllvaine, Bishop of Ohio, at the age of 27. He initially served as assistant minister of Trinity Church, Columbus, after his ordination in to the diaconate. A month after ordination on June 28, the new deacon was married, to Sarah H. Allen, at Walnut Hills, Cincinnati.

This is the island that welcomed the newly ordained Civil War Veteran, Miles Kendrick and his wife in the summer of 1864. The island was growing and changing when Mr. Kendrick arrived. With his leadership, St. Paul's parish was organized in the fall of 1864 and the congregation began meeting in the Put-in-Bay schoolhouse. Throughout the fall, as the Civil War was in its third year, Kendrick gathered island residents for worship services using the 1789 Book of Common Prayer. After meeting together in the school for several months, for prayer, bible study and worship, the islanders felt a church should be built and began to pursue that desire.

Rev. Kendrick was the catalyst for the formation of a congregation in the fall of 1864. On September 25, 1864, the island congregation and Kendrick went to Mr. Cooke and asked if he would help them build a church on South Bass Island. Mr. Cooke never gave money to those who did not need it. No doubt he was aware of the success of the vineyards and other pursuits on the island so he advised the island community to raise as much money as they could and he would help with the rest. On October 3, the residents met at the school house and held a meeting to formally establish themselves as a religious group and decided to seek admittance in the Diocese of Ohio.

The following spring, Jay Cook followed through with his promise to assist the new congregation. The deeds show that Mr. Cooke purchased ¾ acre of land for the church from Jose De Rivera for ten dollars in May, 1865. The island residents did a lot of the work to build the church and the house themselves and contributed to the cost. Cooke supported their efforts financially but in the same time frame he supported other Episcopal churches and organizations with significantly larger gifts. He felt people who had resources should be able to support their own churches.

One year later Bishop McIlvaine, Bishop of Ohio, ordained Kendrick to the priesthood in the chapel in Marietta on June 28, 1865.

Kendrick met Jay Cooke and others who would influence his life during the Civil War. One of these people was Jay Cooke, financier of the civil war. This friendship may have influenced his selection a missioner to South Bass Island. Bishop McIlvane's record for Nov 4th 1864 in the Diocese of Ohio Convention Journal says "Received the canonical notice of the formation of a parish at Put-in-Bay, Lake Erie, under the care of [the] Rev. J. M. Kendrick, Deacon and Missionary, with the title as above. This missionary enterprise has been greatly fostered by Mr. Jay Cooke, of Philadelphia; and a Church is now being built on the island.

On July 30, 1866, Miles Kendrick's wife was confirmed by Bishop McIlvaine during his first visit to the island. Jay Cooke maintained a journal at his home on Gibraltar Island which mentioned the development of St. Paul's. The journal records there were 75 children attending the church school after Kendrick arrived. Kendrick remained on South Bass island until 1868 when he was appointed rector of St. Andrews' Church, Fort Scott, Kan. Kendrick announced his resignation on July 25, 1868, with a planned departure date of October 1.

Bishop Biddel's (Assistant Bishop of Ohio) report to the Diocese of Ohio in November 1866 says: “The next few days were spent at the hospitable home of Jay Cooke, Esq., at Gibraltar, the island at the mouth of Putin-Bay, in Lake Erie. I had the opportunity of appreciating the large openings for usefulness which are placed before our devoted missionary, Rev. J. M. Kendrick, who, by the liberality of Mr. Cooke, is in charge of the whole field of Put-in-Bay island. Mr. Cooke has enabled the islanders to build a neat and commodious church, and has erected a parsonage. Mr. Kendrick, being the only clergyman on the island, and exercising his ministry with tact, prudence and zeal, is securing a position of eminent influence. During the last winter he opened a parish school, which, as I understand, is still continued under a very capable layman. This must contribute largely to the means of healthful religious influence at his disposal. The school is of a higher order than usual; consequently increases the attractiveness of the island as a place of summer resort, especially to Episcopal families. On Sunday, July 30, [1865] I visited this church—St. Paul's, Put-in-Bay. It being the day when Mr. Kendrick was accustomed to visit a missionary station on the main land, I made no formal visitation; but after Morning Prayer and a short address at home on Gibraltar, arrived at the school-house at Putin-Bay, in time to take part in the closing exercises of the Sunday School, and I addressed the children. In the evening, I returned to Put-in-Bay, read prayers and preached in the schoolhouse, the church not being then completed. This is a very encouraging missionary enterprise. For the support of it we are entirely indebted to Mr. Jay Cooke.

From Jay Cooke’s Journal: Sept 23 1865. -- Rev and Mrs Kendrick dined with the Cooke family on Gibraltar on Saturday, Sept 24th 1865 -- Jay Cooke attends church in the morning and evening. Rev Kendrick preached "Pray without Ceasing." His sermon was described as "a faithful and practical exposition of the text." Oct 1st 1865—J Cooke attends the first service, including a baptism, in St. Paul's. June 17, 1866—J Cooke went to St Paul's. In the morning he heard Mr Kendrick preach on Luke 18:37 and in the evening, Mr Clamore preached on Luke 10:32.(a Presbyterian) (Pollard p 131) June 25, 1866—J Cooke went to church at 10am and heard Mr Kendrick preach on Mark 8:36. Sept 23rd 1866—J Cooke attended the confirmation service at St Paul's, noting Mr. Kendrick received a call to Kansas. Jay Cooke wrote in his Journal "God will send another & a suitable & useful man -- let us not doubt -- but it is a sore trial to lose Kendrick -- He is in all respects a perfect minister & never was one more conscientious or energetic in the discharge of every duty. Sept 30th 1866 - Jay Cooke's Journal reports Mr. Kendrick was sick with carbuncles so Jay Cooke led services on Gibraltar for those resident there.

The Rev. J. Miles Kendrick left St. Paul's for Fort Scott, Kansas in 1866. Next, he was elected to the rectorship to St. Paul's Church, Leavenworth, Kansas on October 1, 1868. During his rectorship, the nave of the church was extended and completed. Mr. Kendrick resigned the rectorship July 1, 1874. In 1875, he returned to Ohio to accept the charge of the Church of the Good Shepherd, Columbus.

From 1878 until his 1889 consecration as the third Bishop of New Mexico and Arizona, he served as a diocesan general missionary in Ohio. During that period he also served five years as superintendent of city missions in Cincinnati. In 1888, he received an honorary Doctorate of Divinity degree from Gambier University.

He was consecrated as bishop in Trinity Church, Columbus, Ohio, on January 18, 1889. Kendrick's assignment was the large district of New Mexico, Arizona, and a portion of Texas, covering about 236,313 square miles. It was seen as one of the most difficult districts for any Bishop of the Episcopal Church. This district was one-third the size of the United States. Bishop Kendrick initially settled in Las Vegas, New Mexico, then he moved his office to Albuquerque. Later, he moved his offices to El Paso, Texas. "Recognized as a good, simple-minded, earnest spirited clergyman of powerful physique and self-denying spirit, he was chosen for the work of a "missionary bishop." He administered the diocese, despite great obstacles. He maintained a winter residence in Phoenix and a summer home in Oceanside, California, where he died on December 16, 1911, after twenty-three years of service in the Southwest.

He is mentioned in "The Clergy and the Myth of the American West" by Ferenc M. Szasz in Church History, Vol. 59, No. 4 (Dec., 1990), pp. 497–506 Published by: Cambridge University Press on behalf of the American Society of Church History https://www.jstor.org/stable/3169145

See the records of the Episcopal Church, The Clergy Annual and the records of the dioceses he served for additional information. The military service of Capt. J. Mills Kendrick, U. S. Volunteers, assistant adjutant-general in the 4th Division of the Army of Ohio is well documented.

He was the 147th bishop consecrated in The Episcopal Church.

== See also ==
- Historical list of bishops of the Episcopal Church in the United States of America
