= Richard M. Trelease Jr. =

Bishop of the Episcopal Diocese of the Rio Grande

The Right Reverend Richard Mitchell Trelease Jr.
- Bishop of the Rio Grande
- Church: Episcopal Church
- Diocese: Rio Grande
- Elected: July 6, 1971
- In office: 1972-1988
- Predecessor: Charles J. Kinsolving III
- Successor: Terence Kelshaw
- Previous posts: Coadjutor Bishop of New Mexico and Southwest Texas (1971-1972)

Orders
- Ordination: December 28, 1945 by Harry S. Kennedy
- Consecration: December 15, 1971 by John E. Hines

Personal details
- Born: April 16, 1921 Berkeley, California, United States
- Died: February 25, 2005 (aged 83) Akron, Ohio, United States
- Buried: St John's Cathedral
- Denomination: Anglican
- Parents: Richard Mitchell Trelease & Ruth Benjamin Walker
- Spouse: Jean Ronayne (m. 1943; died 1999) Carol Tucker
- Children: 3
- Education: University of Missouri; Church Divinity School of the Pacific

Richard Mitchell Trelease Jr. (April 16, 1921 – February 25, 2005) was bishop of the Episcopal Diocese of the Rio Grande, serving from 1971 to 1988.

== Early life and education ==
Trelease was born on April 16, 1921, in Berkeley, California, to the Reverend Richard Mitchell Trelease and Ruth Benjamin Walker. He grew up in Kansas City, Missouri. He studied at the University of Missouri from where he graduated with a Bachelor of Arts in 1943. He also attended the Church Divinity School of the Pacific from where he earned a Bachelor of Divinity on June 7, 1945, and an honorary Doctor of Divinity in 1966 and another from the Ohio University in 1972. He married Jean Ronayne on July 2, 1943, and together had three children.

== Ordained ministry ==
Trelease was ordained deacon at St Paul's Church in Kansas City, Missouri, his father's church, on June 27, 1945, by Bishop Robert Nelson Spencer of West Missouri. He was then ordained priest on December 28, 1945, at St Andrew's Cathedral in Honolulu, Hawaii by Bishop Harry S. Kennedy of Hawaii. He served as curate at St Andrew's Cathedral in Honolulu, Hawaii between 1945 and 1947, and then rector of St Christopher's Church Kailua, Hawaii and vicar of St. John's by-the-Sea in Kaneohe, Hawaii from 1947 until 1950. In 1950, he was elected as rector of St Andrew's Cathedral where he remained until 1954 when he moved to Wilmington, Delaware to become rector of St Andrew's Church. In 1962 he then became rector of St Paul's Church in Akron, Ohio, and remained there until 1971.

== Episcopacy ==
Trelease was elected on the seventh ballot as Coadjutor Bishop of New Mexico and Southwest Texas on July 6, 1971, and was consecrated on December 15, 1971, at the Popejoy Hall of the University of New Mexico with Presiding Bishop John E. Hines as chief consecrator. He succeeded as diocesan bishop of New Mexico and Southwest Texas on January 14, 1972, and was installed on January 23, 1972, in St John's Cathedral, Albuquerque, New Mexico. He was well known for his support for women's ordination and publicly endorsed the hiring of two of the Philadelphia Eleven women priests by the Episcopal Divinity School in Cambridge, Massachusetts. He also lobbied for the rights of gay people. During his episcopacy, the name of the diocese was changed from New Mexico and Southwest Texas to Rio Grande, and hence was the first bishop to use that title. His abrupt resignation in 1988 for health reasons led to the election of the conservative and evangelical bishop Terence Kelshaw who reversed many of the progressive milestones initiated by Trelease. Trelease died on February 25, 2005.

== See also ==
- Historical list of bishops of the Episcopal Church in the United States of America
