= Terence Kelshaw =

English-born American Anglican bishop

- VII Bishop of the Rio Grande
- Church: Episcopal Church in the United States of America/Anglican Church in North America
- Diocese: Rio Grande
- In office: 1989–2004
- Predecessor: Richard M. Trelease Jr.
- Successor: Jeffrey N. Steenson

Orders
- Ordination: 1968
- Consecration: 1989 by Edmond Browning

Personal details
- Born: 4 October 1936 Manchester, Lancashire, UK
- Died: 5 July 2015 (aged 78)

Terence Kelshaw (4 October 1936 – 5 July 2015) was an English-born American Anglican bishop.

Kelshaw studied at Oakhill Theology College, London University, where he graduated with a degree in theology in 1967. He was ordained a deacon in 1967 and a priest in September 1968. He received a Doctor of Ministry degree in 1986.

Kelshaw was the seventh bishop of the Episcopal Diocese of the Rio Grande from March 1989 to 2004. An Evangelical and theological conservative, he opposed the liberal leanings of the Episcopal Church in the United States, including its acceptance of non-celibate homosexual clergy. After retirement, he ministered as a bishop in the Anglican Church of Uganda in 2008 and subsequently in the Anglican Church in North America (a then newly-formed denomination not within the Anglican Communion) in that church's Diocese of the Southwest.

Kelshaw died on 5 July 2015, aged 78 years old.

== See also ==
- Historical list of bishops of the Episcopal Church in the United States of America

Episcopal Church (USA) titles
Preceded by Richard M. Trelease Jr.	Bishop of Rio Grande; 1989–2004	Succeeded by Jeffrey N. Steenson
