= Charles J. Kinsolving III =

Bishop of the Episcopal Diocese of Rio Grande

The Right Reverend Charles James Kinsolving III
- Bishop of New Mexico and Southwest Texas
- Church: Episcopal Church
- Diocese: New Mexico and Southwest Texas
- Elected: 1953
- In office: 1956–1972
- Predecessor: James M. Stoney
- Successor: Richard M. Trelease Jr.
- Previous posts: Coadjutor Bishop of New Mexico and Southwest Texas (1953–1956)

Orders
- Ordination: January 1929 by Harry Tunis Moore
- Consecration: October 27, 1953 by James M. Stoney

Personal details
- Born: January 14, 1904 Brooklyn, New York City, New York, United States
- Died: March 14, 1984 (aged 80) Santa Fe, New Mexico, United States
- Buried: Fairview Cemetery
- Denomination: Anglican
- Parents: Charles James Kinsolving, Jr. & Edith Minturn Lewis
- Spouse: Mary Virginia Robinson (m. 1932)
- Children: 2
- Education: University of the South

Charles James Kinsolving III (January 14, 1904 – March 14, 1984) was an Episcopal prelate who served as Bishop of New Mexico and Southwest Texas from 1956 to 1972.

== Early life and education ==
He was born in Brooklyn on January 14, 1904, to Charles James Kinsolving, Jr. (1874–1951) and Edith Minturn Lewis (1869–1952). He received his education at Terrill Preparatory School in Dallas, Texas, and later attended the Massachusetts Institute of Technology. Additionally, he pursued studies at the University of the South, where he graduated with a Bachelor of Arts in 1925 and a Bachelor of Divinity in 1930. He married Mary Virginia Robinson (1911–1969) on August 2, 1932, and the couple had two children together.

== Ordained ministry ==
Kinsolving was ordained deacon in June 1928, and a priest in January 1929 by Bishop Harry Tunis Moore of Dallas. He served as curate at St Matthew's Cathedral in Dallas, Texas, between 1928 and 1929 and then priest-in-charge of the churches in Greenville, Texas, Denton, Texas, and Commerce, Texas, from 1929 to 1936. He was a member of Kappa Sigma and Phi Beta Kappa. Between 1928 and 1936 he also served as chairman of the Student Work committee of the Episcopal Diocese of Dallas. From 1937 to 1938 he was chairman of the Department for Christian Education, and from 1938 as chairman of the Department of Christian Social Relations.

== Bishop ==
In 1953, Kinsolving was elected Coadjutor Bishop of New Mexico and Southwest Texas and was consecrated on October 27, 1953, in St John's Cathedral by Bishop James M. Stoney. He succeeded Stoney as diocesan in 1956 and retained the post until his own resignation on January 14, 1972. In 1971, he reduced the diocese's annual pledge to $1 in protest of the church's financial support of Reies Tijerina. He died on March 14, 1984, in Santa Fe, New Mexico, and was buried in Fairview Cemetery.

== See also ==
- Historical list of bishops of the Episcopal Church in the United States of America
