= Paul Matthews (bishop) =

American bishop

The Right Reverend Paul Matthews D.D., LL.D.
- Bishop of New Jersey
- Church: Episcopal Church
- Diocese: New Jersey
- Elected: October 7, 1914
- In office: 1915–1937
- Predecessor: John Scarborough
- Successor: Wallace John Gardner

Orders
- Ordination: October 18, 1891 by George Worthington
- Consecration: January 25, 1915 by Boyd Vincent

Personal details
- Born: December 25, 1866 Glendale, Ohio, United States
- Died: January 17, 1954 (aged 87) Winter Park, Florida, United States
- Denomination: Anglican
- Parents: Stanley Matthews; Mary Ann Black
- Spouse: Elsie Procter
- Children: 5, including Thomas

Paul Clement Matthews (December 25, 1866 – January 17, 1954) was the fifth bishop of the Episcopal Diocese of New Jersey, serving from 1915 to 1937.

== Biography ==
He was born in Glendale, Ohio, the son of Stanley Matthews, an Associate Justice of the United States Supreme Court and Mary Ann Black. He was educated at St Paul's school in Concord, New Hampshire and later at Princeton College. He studied at the General Theological Seminary and graduated in 1890. He also briefly studied at the University of Oxford as an unattached student.

He was ordained deacon on June 22, 1890, by Boyd Vincent of Southern Ohio, and served as deacon at the Church of the Advent in Cincinnati, Ohio. He was ordained a priest on October 18, 1891, by Bishop George Worthington of Nebraska and retained his post at the Church of the Advent till 1895. After a trip to the Holy Land, he became rector of St Luke's Church in Cincinnati, Ohio where he remained till 1904. That same year he became Dean of St Paul's Cathedral while in 1913 he became Dean of the Cathedral of Our Merciful Saviour in Faribault, Minnesota. He was also professor of divinity at the Seabury Divinity School.

On October 7, 1914, he was elected Bishop of New Jersey and was consecrated on January 25, 1915, by Bishop Boyd Vincent. He retired on November 1, 1937. He died on January 17, 1954, in Winter Park, Florida at the age of 87. Matthews married the Procter & Gamble heiress Elsie Procter; their son, Thomas Stanley Matthews, was editor of Time magazine.
