= Community of the Transfiguration =

Anglican religious community

Sisters from the Community of the Transfiguration.

The Community of the Transfiguration is an Anglican (Episcopalian) religious community of nuns, founded by Mother Eva Mary (formerly Eva Lee Matthews) and Beatrice Henderson in the winter of 1898.

As new nuns working to organize a community, Sister Beatrice and Mother Eva envisioned an order patterned after the lives of Mary and Martha from the Bible. The order's first home was on Freeman Ave. in the City of Cincinnati, where Mother Eva's brother served as the Rector of St. Luke's, the local Episcopal Church.

Working with mothers and children to promote education and basic sanitation, the order developed a following in the area and built a larger group of sisters. In the summer 1898, the Sisterhood purchased land at the top of a hill in Glendale, a secluded area, then well North of the city of Cincinnati. It is there where the Community's Mother House was established.

The Motherhouse serves as the center of ministries and the home of the order's Bethany School. The order also operates a Spirituality Center and St. Monica's Recreation center in a nearby underprivileged neighborhood.

The Sisters live under the evangelical counsels of poverty, chastity and obedience, and pray the Divine Office four times each day. In addition to their main house in Ohio, the sisters also operate service missions in California, Northern Ohio and the Dominican Republic. The motto of the Sisters is "Benignitas, Simplicitas, Hilaritas"—Latin for "Kindness, Simplicity and Joy."
