= Adeline Blanchard Tyler =

American nurse, missionary, and activist

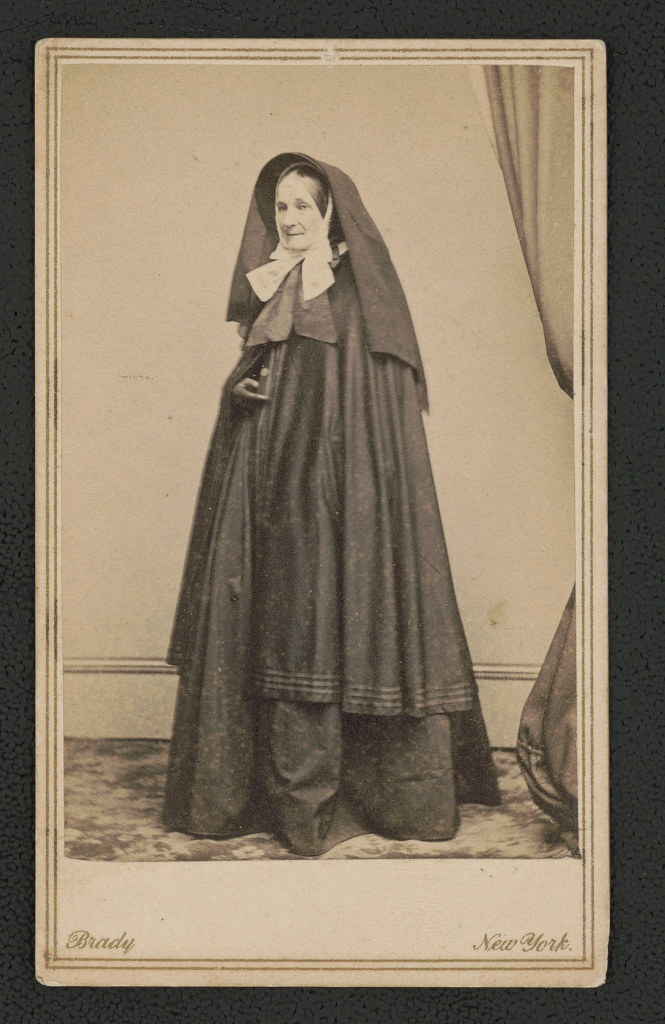
- Born: Adeline Blanchard; December 8, 1805; Massachusetts
- Died: 1875 (aged 69–70); Massachusetts
- Occupations: deaconess, nurse

Adeline Blanchard Tyler (December 8, 1805– January 9, 1875) was an American nurse, missionary, and activist. She is most notable for her nursing work during the American Civil War.

== Biography ==
Adeline Blanchard was born in Massachusetts in 1805. A longtime resident of Boston and prominent member of the Episcopal Church, she married John Tyler, a well known auctioneer in the city. John was 26 years older than Adeline, and died of a stroke in 1853. Following his death, Adeline continued her activities within the Episcopal Church, eventually rising to become a deaconess.

During the 1850s, Tyler travelled to Germany and enrolled in the Deaconesses’ Institute in Kaiserswerth, where she studied nursing. This experience had a major impact on her work with the church, and upon her return to Boston she continued to be active in nursing. In 1856 she was invited to head a church-funded infirmary in Baltimore; she took on the role and pursued her job zealously, though some members of the church considered her to be overzealously charitable. Her role at the Baltimore infirmary was later diminished when the church created a new leadership position and appointed a male official to manage the infirmary, effectively supplanting her; this usurpation caused Tyler to resign from her position, but she continued on in a smaller capacity to train apprentice deaconesses.

Following the outbreak of the American Civil War in 1861, the city of Baltimore was gripped by an extended period of unrest. Although Maryland did not secede, the city was home to a large number of Confederate sympathizers, and so several riots broke out, most notably the Baltimore riot of April 1861. During this riot, Tyler worked extensively to aid Union soldiers wounded in the riot; she lodged soldiers in her residence, and in one instance hailed a furniture wagon to transport the injured. For her treatment of soldiers belonging to a Massachusetts regiment, Tyler was granted a formal vote of thanks from the Massachusetts House of Representatives in 1862.

In the aftermath of the riots, she was put in charge of a military hospital on Camden Street in Baltimore. She held this position for some months before being removed after she noted that she intended to treat the wounded regardless of their political affiliation or loyalty to the Union - a statement that drew accusations of her being a Southern sympathizer. Tyler would continue her work during the war, first taking a leadership position at a hospital in Chester, Pennsylvania and later at the Naval School Hospital in Annapolis, Maryland. In the postwar years, Tyler worked as Lady Superintendent of the Midnight Mission, a church-run facility which cared for prostitutes in New York City. However, in 1872 she was told that she had developed breast cancer and so resigned her position. She died in Massachusetts in 1875.
