= Frederick Bingham Howden =

Missionary bishop in the Episcopal Church

The Right Reverend Frederick Bingham Howden
- Missionary Bishop of New Mexico and Southwest Texas
- Church: Episcopal Church
- Diocese: New Mexico and Southwest Texas
- Elected: 1913
- In office: 1914–1940
- Predecessor: Miles Kendrick
- Successor: James M. Stoney

Orders
- Ordination: December 23, 1894 by Henry C. Potter
- Consecration: January 14, 1914 by Daniel S. Tuttle

Personal details
- Born: December 10, 1869 New York City, New York, U.S.
- Died: November 12, 1940 (aged 70) Albuquerque, New Mexico, U.S.
- Buried: Fairview Memorial Park, Albuquerque, New Mexico
- Denomination: Anglican
- Parents: William Douglas Howden & Esther Jane Orrell
- Spouse: Angelica Constance Faber (m. 1895; died 1923)
- Children: 7

Frederick Bingham Howden (December 10, 1869 – November 12, 1940) was a missionary bishop of New Mexico and Southwest Texas in The Episcopal Church.

== Early life and education ==
Howden was born on December 10, 1869, in West New Brighton, New York City, to William Douglas Howden and Esther Jane Orrell. He studied at Trinity College, Toronto, and graduated with a Bachelor of Arts in 1891, a Master of Arts in 1893, and an honorary Doctor of Divinity in 1914. He also studied for the priesthood at the General Theological Seminary graduating with a Bachelor of Sacred Theology in 1894. He was awarded a Doctor of Sacred Theology by the General Seminary in 1927.

== Ordained ministry ==
Howden was ordained deacon on May 20, 1894, and was ordained a priest on December 23, 1894, at the Church of the Holy Trinity in Harlem by Bishop Henry C. Potter of New York. He served as assistant at St John's Church in Detroit, Michigan, between 1894 and 1895, and then at Calvary Church in New York City from 1895 to 1897. He then became rector of Emmanuel Church in Cumberland, Maryland, and served until 1902. He was simultaneously Archdeacon of Cumberland between 1900 and 1902. In 1902 he was elected rector of St John's Church in Washington, D.C., and rector of the National Cathedral School.

== Episcopacy ==
Howden was elected as the Missionary Bishop of New Mexico and Southwest Texas in 1913 and was consecrated bishop on January 14, 1914, at St John's Church by Presiding Bishop Daniel S. Tuttle as chief consecrator. He died in office in 1940.

== Family and legacy ==
Howden married Angelica Constance Faber on February 20, 1895, and had seven children. His son Reverend Frederick B. "Ted" Howden served with the 200th Coast Artillery during World War II as the unit chaplain, and was part of the Bataan Death March. Ted died on December 11, 1942, while in captivity.

Frederick's existing descendants typically refer to him by his nickname, Ted. There is an ongoing movement within the Episcopal Diocese of the Rio Grande, to honor him for his selfless treatment of his peers while in captivity. Several survivor accounts credit him for having given his rations to those who he believed were in greater need of sustenance. The movement was initially spearheaded by his great niece Melissa Howden, and has gained great support throughout New Mexico and other reaches of the Episcopal Church. Melissa Howden produced, directed, and narrated Be Home Soon: Letters From My Grandfather, a documentary about the stories of Ted Howden, his legacy, and those who he left behind.

== See also ==
- Historical list of bishops of the Episcopal Church in the United States of America
