= Cathedral Church of St. John (Albuquerque, New Mexico) =

Historic church in New Mexico, United States

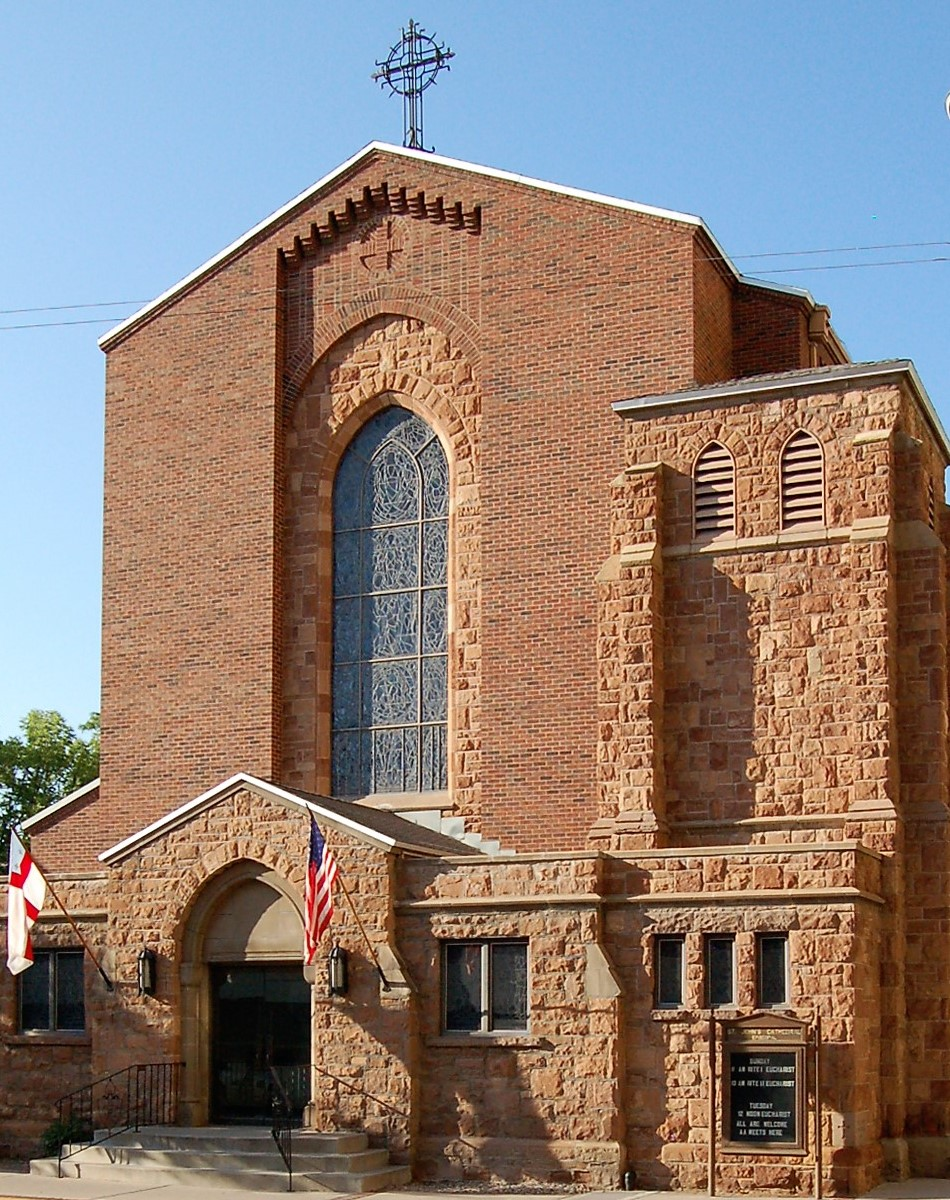
- The cathedral in July, 2012

- Location within New Mexico
- 35°04′56.2″N 106°39′6.54″W
- Location: 318 Silver Avenue SW; Albuquerque, New Mexico
- Country: United States
- Denomination: Episcopal Church in the United States of America
- Website: www.stjohnsabq.org

History
- Founded: 1882
- Dedicated: November 11, 1952

Architecture
- Architect: John Gaw Meem
- Style: Gothic Revival
- Groundbreaking: 1951
- Completed: 1952

Administration
- Diocese: Rio Grande

Clergy
- Bishop: Michael Buerkel Hunn
- Dean: Kristina Maulden
- St. John's Cathedral
- U.S. National Register of Historic Places
- MPS: Buildings Designed by John Gaw Meem MPS
- NRHP reference No.: 100003029
- Added to NRHP: October 19, 2018

The Cathedral Church of St. John is an Episcopal cathedral located in Albuquerque, New Mexico, United States. It is the seat of the Diocese of the Rio Grande. In 2018 the cathedral church was listed on the National Register of Historic Places. The cathedral reported 2,074 members in 2015 and 2,293 members in 2023; no membership statistics were reported in 2024 parochial reports. Plate and pledge income reported for the congregation in 2024 was $772,641. Average Sunday attendance (ASA) in 2024 was 259 persons.

== History ==
St. John's was established in 1882. Land was purchased at the southeast corner of Fourth Street and Silver Avenue for $5,000 and the first church building was built that same year. It was a Gothic Revival building built from red Arizona sandstone and brick with a corner bell tower. The first service, led by Bishop George Kelly Dunlop, was held in November 1882 with 33 people in attendance. The Vestry of St. John's passed a resolution and the Convocation of 1920 approved the designation of St. John's as the cathedral church of the Missionary District of New Mexico and Southwest Texas for a one-year trial. Three years later new canons were adopted and the designation became official.

Henry R.A. O’Malley became dean and raised $25,000 for the Cathedral House, which was to house offices for the parish and the Missionary District. It was designed by Santa Fe architect John Gaw Meem and its cornerstone was placed on Easter Sunday, 1930. Meem was retained in 1950 to design the new cathedral to replace the old church. Meem's design preserved the front and side entrances and bell tower from the old church while adding a much larger nave, executed in a modern Gothic style using brick and reclaimed stone. The groundbreaking was held the day after Easter in 1951 and the first services in the new cathedral were held on October 5, 1952. It was dedicated on November 11, 1952.

Anne Tropeano, who was from New Mexico, was ordained by the woman priest movement here, in October 2021. She is known as "Father Anne" and is not supported by the Roman Catholic church.

== See also ==
- List of the Episcopal cathedrals of the United States
- List of cathedrals in the United States
