= List of Mortar Board members =

Mortar Board is an American national honor society for college juniors and seniors. It was established in 1918 in Syracuse, New York by merging four local women's organizations from four institutions. It started admitting men in 1975. Some of its notable members follow.

== Academics ==
- Shauna Adix, educator and college administrator
- Lena Lovato Archuleta (University of Denver, 1941), educator, school librarian and administrator
- Judith Bronstein, ecologist, academic, and evolutionary biologist
- Vera Burridge Baits, member of the board of regents for the University of Michigan
- Marian Oldfather Boner, first director of the Texas State Law Library and sat on the editorial board of the Texas Law Review
- P. Dee Boersma (Central Michigan University, 1973), conservation biologist and professor at the University of Washington
- Kimberlé Crenshaw (Cornell), scholar of critical race theory and professor at the UCLA School of Law and Columbia Law School
- Margaret Cuninggim, university professor and administrator
- Lucy Dalglish (University of North Dakota, 1979), professor and former dean at the University of Maryland Philip Merrill College of Journalism
- Eleanor Hadley (University of Washington, 1986), academic and economist with the United States Department of State and Central Intelligence Agency
- Cora Barbara Hennel, professor of mathematics at Indiana University
- Martin C. Jischke, president of Purdue University
- Emma May Laney, English professor at Agnes Scott College
- Frances Lucas, president of Millsaps College
- Naomi Meara, psychologist, researcher and academic
- Duane Nellis, president of Ohio University, Texas Tech University, and the University of Idaho
- Margaret Ellen Newell, professor of history at Ohio State University
- Mary Beth Norton, professor emeritus of American History at the Department of History at Cornell University
- Louise Pound, folklorist, linguist, and college professor at the University of Nebraska
- Stephen Silvia, professor at American University's School of International Service
- Nancy E. Gwinn (University of Wyoming, 1966), director of the Smithsonian Libraries
- Annette Shelby, first woman tenured professor at the McDonough School of Business
- Adele Hagner Stamp, first dean of women at the University of Maryland
- Tara Welch, professor of classics at the University of Kansas
- Agnes E. Wells, dean of women and professor of mathematics and astronomy at Indiana University
- Eileen Wilson-Oyelaran (Pomona College, 1968), president of Kalamazoo College

== Art and entertainment ==
- Scribner Ames, artist
- LeVar Burton (National Citation Recipient, 2004), actor, director, television host, and literacy advocate
- Leon Harris (Ohio University, 1982), Emmy Award winning news anchor
- Allison Kreiger, model and Miss Florida 2006
- Rue McClannahan (University of Tulsa, 1955), actress
- Lucky Meisenheimer, actor
- Erin Moriarty, television news reporter and correspondent
- Keith Olbermann (Cornell), sports and political commentator
- Fred Rogers (National Citation Recipient, 1997), host of Mister Rogers' Neighborhood
- Marion Ross (San Diego State University, 1965), actress
- Pepper Schwartz (Washington University in St. Louis, 1966), author, sexologist, sociologist, and expert on Married at First Sight
- Mary Wickes, actress

== Business and nonprofits ==
- Ruth Sharp Altshuler (Southern Methodist University, 1971), philanthropist and the first woman to serve or chair several boards
- Mary Maxwell Gates (University of Washington, 1949), banker, civic activist, and nonprofit director
- Colleen Willoughby (Whitman College, 1954), founder and president of the Washington Women's Foundation and the director of Global Women Partners in Philanthropy

== Law ==
- Sue Bell Cobb (University of Alabama, 2018), Chief Justice of the Alabama Supreme Court
- Mary H. Donlon (Cornell), Senior Judge of the United States Customs Court
- Sandra Day O'Connor, former U.S. Supreme Court associate justice
- Nancy H. Rogers (University of Kansas, 1968), Attorney General of Ohio and dean of Moritz College of Law

== Literature and journalism ==
- Maya Angelou, poet
- Rita Dove (Miami University, 1973), United States Poet Laureate and author
- James Hamblin (Wake Forest University, 2004), author, journalist, staff writer at The Atlantic, and a lecturer in public health policy at Yale University
- Beverly Deepe Keever, journalist, Vietnam War correspondent, and author
- Carolyn Kreiter-Foronda, Poet Laureate of Virginia
- Flora Lewis (University of California, Los Angeles, 1940), journalist with The Washington Post and The New York Times
- Jane Tunstall Lingo, pioneering journalist
- Bruce Littlefield, author and lifestyle expert
- Alice Dunbar Nelson (Cornell), poet and journalist involved in the Harlem Renaissance
- Marjorie Kinnan Rawlings, novelist
- Janice Woods Windle, novelist

== Politics ==
- Anne Gorsuch Burford, Administrator of the Environmental Protection Agency and Colorado House of Representatives
- Jimmy Carter, 39th president of the United States
- Barbara Franklin (Pennsylvania State University, 1961), United States Secretary of Commerce
- John Glenn (Ohio State University, 2001), astronaut and United States Senate
- Rudy Giuliani, 107th mayor of New York City
- Ann-Eve Mansfeld Johnson, assistant chairman of the Republican National Committee
- Keith J. Krach (Purdue University, 1978), Under Secretary of State for Economic Growth, Energy, and the Environment
- Sheila Kuehl (University of California, Los Angeles, 1960), California State Senate and California State Assembly
- Doris Meissner (University of Wisconsin–Madison, 1962), Commissioner of the Immigration and Naturalization Service
- Maurine Neuberger, United States Senate
- Lois North (University of California, Berkeley, 1942), Washington House of Representatives and Washington Senate
- Condoleezza Rice (University of Denver, 1973), former U.S. Secretary of State
- Alan Simpson (University of Wyoming, 1997), United States Senate, Wyoming House of Representatives, and co-chair of the National Commission on Fiscal Responsibility and Reform
- Helen Dickerson Wise (Pennsylvania State University, 1948), Pennsylvania House of Representatives

== Religion ==
- Pamela Pauly Chinnis, first woman to serve as president of the House of Deputies of the Episcopal Church in the United States of America

== Science, medicine, and technology ==
- Betty Clements, member of the Women Airforce Service Pilots (WASP) during World War II, became the first woman neurology resident at the Mayo Clinic, and co-founded the Barrow Neurological Institute
- Rita R. Colwell (Purdue University, 1955), microbiologist and former director of the National Science Foundation
- Lillian Moller Gilbreth, psychologist and industrial engineer
- John Glenn (Ohio State University, 2001), NASA astronaut and United States Senate
- Marlene Hazle, computer science at RAND Corporation and Mitre Corporation
- Anita Hopper, molecular geneticist who is a professor at the Ohio State University
- Jonny Kim (University of San Diego, 2011), flight surgeon, Naval aviator, physician, and NASA astronaut.
- Edith Wilson Miles, biochemist
- David Isaac Murray, computer scientist and product designer
- Irene C. Peden, electrical engineer
- Judith Resnik (Carnegie Mellon University, 1977), NASA Challenger space shuttle astronaut
- Sally Ride, physicist and first female NASA astronaut
- Wendee M. Wechsberg, biobehavioral social science researcher and director of RTI International

== Sports ==
- Lance Armstrong, professional road racing cyclist
- Drew Brees (Purdue University, 2000), former professional football player with the New Orleans Saints and San Diego Chargers
- George Hoey, professional football player in the National Football League
- Moton Hopkins, gridiron football player
- Aron Ralston (Carnegie Mellon University, 1996), mountaineer and author
- Katie Smith (Ohio State University, 1995), Olympic gold medalist, college and professional basketball player and coach
