= Thomas Burke (Medal of Honor sailor) =

Irish-American sailor and recipient of the Medal of Honor

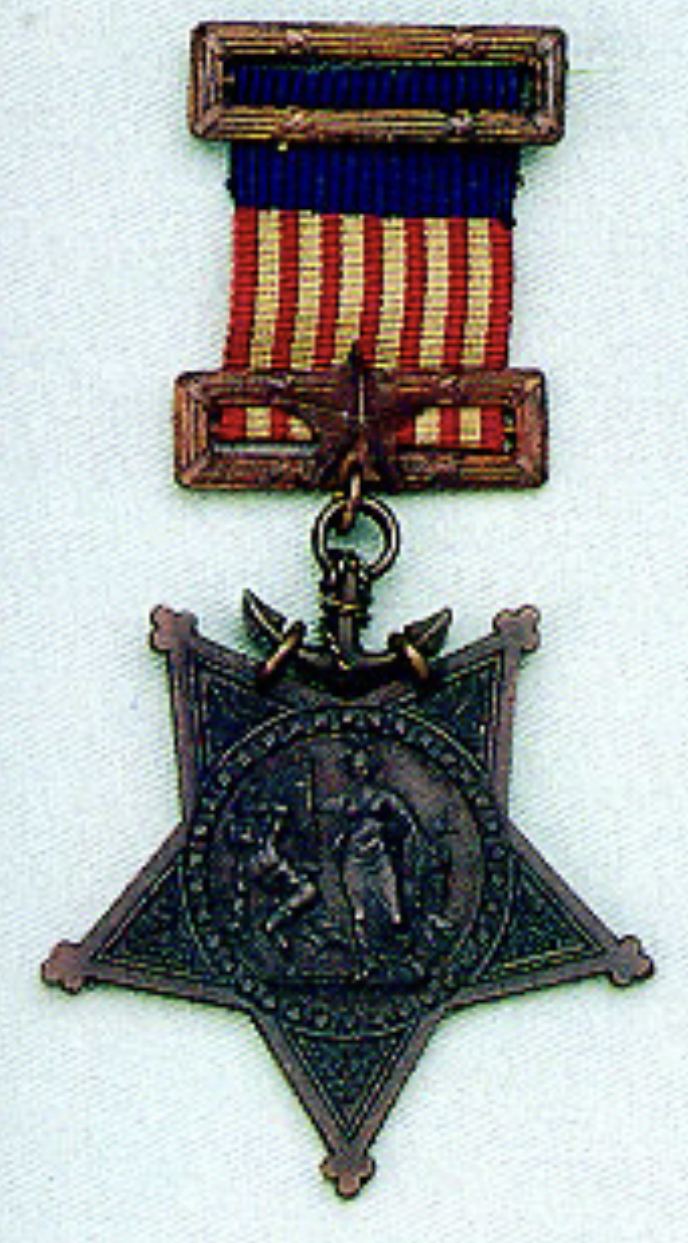
- The Medal of Honor awarded to Thomas Burke
- Born: c. 1833; Galway, Ireland
- Died: April 23, 1883 (aged 51); Pensacola, Florida, U.S.
- Burial place: St Michaels, Pensacola, Florida, U.S.
- Military career
- Allegiance: United States of America
- Branch: United States Navy
- Rank: Seaman
- Unit: USS De Soto
- Awards: Medal of Honor

Thomas Burke (c. 1833 – 27 October 1883) was an Irish-American sailor in the United States Navy and a recipient of the United States military's highest decoration, the Medal of Honor.

== Biography ==
Burke was a native of County Galway, Ireland. He immigrated to the U.S. and joined the Navy from New York state on January 21, 1862. By May 10, 1866, he was serving as a seaman on the USS De Soto. On that day, while the ship was off the coast of Eastport, Maine, he and two shipmates rescued two sailors from the USS Winooski from drowning. For this action, he and his shipmates, Seaman Richard Bates and Captain of the After-guard John Brown, were awarded the Medal of Honor three months later, on August 1, 1866.

Burke's official Medal of Honor citation reads:

For heroic conduct, with two comrades, in rescuing from drowning James Rose and John Russell, seamen, of the U.S.S. Winooski, of Eastport, Maine, 10 May 1866.

== Death and legacy ==
Burke died at age 51, cause of death unknown. He was later buried at St. Michael's Church in the town of Pensacola, Florida in 1883, as evidenced in his pension file. St. Elizabeth's in Washington, D.C., and the National Cemetery Administration acknowledged that Burke was never buried in Washington, D.C., although the mistake appears on many websites as of 2016. There are veterans of the same name buried in Washington, D.C., but none received the Medal of Honor. The erroneous Medal of Honor grave marker in Washington, D.C., was being replaced as of January 2016 by a non-Medal of Honor marker. Officials and others have contributed to resolving the discrepancy, including staff at St. Elizabeth's, the Medal of Honor Historical Society of the United States, the Congressional Medal of Honor Society and the National Cemetery Administration.

St. Michael's in Pensacola has several burial grounds and, as of 2016, was attempting to determine in which one Burke was buried.

== See also ==
- List of Medal of Honor recipients during peacetime
