= John Brown (Medal of Honor) =

- Born: c. 1838; Denmark
- Military career
- Allegiance: United States
- Branch: United States Navy
- Rank: Captain of the Afterguard
- Unit: USS De Soto
- Awards: Medal of Honor

John Brown (born c. 1838, date of death unknown) was a United States Navy sailor and a recipient of the United States military's highest decoration, the Medal of Honor.

A native of Denmark, Brown immigrated to the U.S. and joined the Navy from Maryland. By May 10, 1866, he was serving as captain of the afterguard on the USS De Soto. On that day, while the De Soto was off the coast of Eastport, Maine, he and two shipmates rescued two sailors from the USS Winooski from drowning. For this action, he and his shipmates, Seaman Richard Bates and Seaman Thomas Burke, were awarded the Medal of Honor three months later, on August 1.

== Medal of Honor citation ==

For heroic conduct with 2 comrades, in rescuing from drowning James Rose and John Russell, seamen, of the U.S.S. Winooski, off Eastport, Maine, 10 May 1866.

== See also ==
- List of Medal of Honor recipients in non-combat incidents
