= Richard Bates (Medal of Honor) =

United States Navy Medal of Honor recipient

Wyndham Richard Bates
- Born: 1829; Wales
- Died: December 7, 1889 (aged 59–60); Brooklyn, New York, U.S.
- Burial place: Cypress Hills National Cemetery, Brooklyn, New York
- Military career
- Allegiance: United States of America
- Branch: United States Navy
- Rank: Seaman
- Unit: USS De Soto
- Awards: Medal of Honor

Wyndham Richard Bates (1829–1889) was a United States Navy sailor and a recipient of the United States military's highest decoration, the Medal of Honor.

A native of Wales, Bates immigrated to the U.S. and joined the Navy from the state of New York. By May 10, 1866, he was serving as a seaman on the USS De Soto. On that day, while the De Soto was off the coast of Eastport, Maine, he and two shipmates rescued two sailors from the USS Winooski from drowning. For this action, he and his shipmates, Captain of the Afterguard John Brown and Seaman Thomas Burke, were awarded the Medal of Honor three months later, on August 1.

Bates' official Medal of Honor citation reads:

For heroic conduct in rescuing from drowning James Rose and John Russell, seamen of the U.S.S. Winooski, off Eastport, Maine, 10 May 1866.

== See also ==
- List of Medal of Honor recipients in non-combat incidents
