= List of General Conventions of the Episcopal Church =

This is a list of General Conventions of the Episcopal Church, which are held every three years.

== List of Conventions ==
Number	Dates	Location
I	Sep. 27-Oct. 7, 1785	Philadelphia, Pennsylvania
II	June 20-June 26, 1786	Philadelphia, Pennsylvania
II	Oct. 10-Oct. 11, 1786	Wilmington, Delaware
III	July 28-Aug. 8 and Sep. 29-Oct. 16, 1789	Philadelphia, Pennsylvania
IV	Sep. 11-Sep. 19, 1792	New York City
V	Sep. 8-Sep. 18, 1795	Philadelphia, Pennsylvania
VI	June 11-June 19, 1799	Philadelphia, Pennsylvania
VII	Sep. 8-Sep. 12, 1801	Trenton, New Jersey
VIII	Sep. 11-Sep. 18, 1804	New York City
IX	May 17-May 26, 1808	Baltimore, Maryland
X	May 21-May 24, 1811	New Haven, Connecticut
XI	May 17-May 24, 1814	Philadelphia, Pennsylvania
XII	May 20-May 27, 1817	New York City
XIII	May 16-May 24, 1820	Philadelphia, Pennsylvania
	Oct. 30-Nov. 3, 1821	Philadelphia, Pennsylvania
XIV	May 20-May 26, 1823	Philadelphia, Pennsylvania
XV	Nov. 7-Nov. 15, 1826	Philadelphia, Pennsylvania
XVI	August 12-August 20, 1829	Philadelphia, Pennsylvania
XVII	Oct. 17-Oct. 31, 1832	New York City
XVIII	August 19-Sep. 1, 1835	Philadelphia, Pennsylvania
XIX	Sep. 5-Sep. 17, 1838	Philadelphia, Pennsylvania
XX	Oct. 6-Oct. 19, 1841	New York City
XXI	Oct. 2-Oct. 22, 1844	Philadelphia, Pennsylvania
XXII	Oct. 6-Oct. 28, 1847	New York City
XXIII	Oct. 2-Oct. 16, 1850	Cincinnati, Ohio
XXIV	Oct. 5-Oct. 26, 1853	New York City
XXV	Oct. 1-Oct. 21, 1856	Philadelphia, Pennsylvania
XXVI	Oct. 5-Oct. 22, 1859	Richmond, Virginia
XXVII	Oct. 1-Oct. 17, 1862	New York City
XXVIII	Oct. 4-Oct. 24, 1865	Philadelphia, Pennsylvania
XXIX	Oct. 7-Oct. 29, 1868	New York City
XXX	Oct. 4-Oct. 26, 1871	Baltimore, Maryland
XXXI	Oct. 7-Nov. 3, 1874	New York City
XXXII	Oct. 3-Oct. 25, 1877	Boston, Massachusetts
XXXIII	Oct. 6-Oct. 27, 1880	New York City
XXXIV	Oct. 3-Oct. 26, 1883	Philadelphia, Pennsylvania
XXXV	Oct. 6-Oct. 28, 1886	Chicago, Illinois
XXXVI	Oct. 2-Oct. 24, 1889	New York City
XXXVII	Oct. 5-Oct. 25, 1892	Baltimore, Maryland
XXXVIII	Oct. 2-Oct. 22, 1895	Minneapolis, Minnesota
XXXIX	Oct. 5-Oct. 25, 1898	Washington, D.C.
XL	Oct. 2-Oct. 17, 1901	San Francisco, California
XLI	Oct. 5-Oct. 25, 1904	Boston, Massachusetts
XLII	Oct. 2-Oct. 19, 1907	Richmond, Virginia
XLIII	Oct. 5-Oct. 21, 1910	Cincinnati, Ohio
XLIV	Oct. 8-Oct. 25, 1913	New York City
XLV	Oct. 11-Oct. 27, 1916	St. Louis, Missouri
XLVI	Oct. 8-Oct. 24, 1919	Detroit, Michigan
XLVII	Sep. 6-Sep. 23, 1922	Portland, Oregon
XLVIII	Oct. 7-Oct. 24, 1925	New Orleans, Louisiana
XLIX	Oct. 10-Oct. 25, 1928	Washington, D.C.
L	Sep. 16-Sep. 30, 1931	Denver, Colorado
LI	Oct. 10-Oct. 23, 1934	Atlantic City, New Jersey
LII	Oct. 6-Oct. 19, 1937	Cincinnati, Ohio
LIII	Oct. 9-Oct. 19, 1940	Kansas City, Missouri
LIV	Oct. 2-Oct. 11, 1943	Cleveland, Ohio
LV	Sep. 10-Sep. 20, 1946	Philadelphia, Pennsylvania
LVI	Sep. 26-Oct. 7, 1949	San Francisco, California
LVII	Sep. 8-Sep. 19, 1952	Boston, Massachusetts
LVIII	Sep. 4-Sep. 15, 1955	Honolulu, Hawaii
LIX	Oct. 5-Oct. 17, 1958	Miami Beach, Florida
LX	Sep. 17-Sep. 29, 1961	Detroit, Michigan
LXI	Oct. 11-Oct. 23, 1964	St. Louis, Missouri
LXII	Sep. 17-Sep. 27, 1967	Seattle, Washington
	August 31-Sep. 5, 1969	South Bend, Indiana
LXIII	Oct. 11-Oct. 22, 1970	Houston, Texas
LXIV	Sep. 29-Oct. 11, 1973	Louisville, Kentucky
LXV	Sep. 11-Sep. 23, 1976	Minneapolis-Saint Paul, Minnesota
LXVI	Sep. 6-Sep. 20, 1979	Denver, Colorado
LXVII	Sep. 5-Sep. 15, 1982	New Orleans, Louisiana
LXVIII	Sep. 7-Sep. 14, 1985	Anaheim, California
LXIX	July 2-July 11, 1988	Detroit, Michigan
LXX	July 11-July 20, 1991	Phoenix, Arizona
LXXI	August 24-Sep. 2, 1994	Indianapolis, Indiana
LXXII	July 16-July 25, 1997	Philadelphia, Pennsylvania
LXXIII	July 5-July 14, 2000	Denver, Colorado
LXXIV	July 30-August 8, 2003	Minneapolis, Minnesota
LXXV	June 13-June 21, 2006	Columbus, Ohio
LXXVI	July 8-July 17, 2009	Anaheim, California
LXXVII	July 5-July 12, 2012	Indianapolis, Indiana
LXXVIII	June 25-July 3, 2015	Salt Lake City, Utah
LXXIX	July 5-July 13, 2018	Austin, Texas
LXXX	July 7–14, 2022	Baltimore, Maryland
LXXXI	June 23−28, 2024	Louisville, Kentucky
LXXXII	July 3−8, 2027	Phoenix, Arizona

== Sources ==
- Bob N. Wallace, The General Convention of the Episcopal Church (New York: Seabury Press, 1976)
