= First General Convention of the Episcopal Church =

First meeting of the Episcopal General Convention

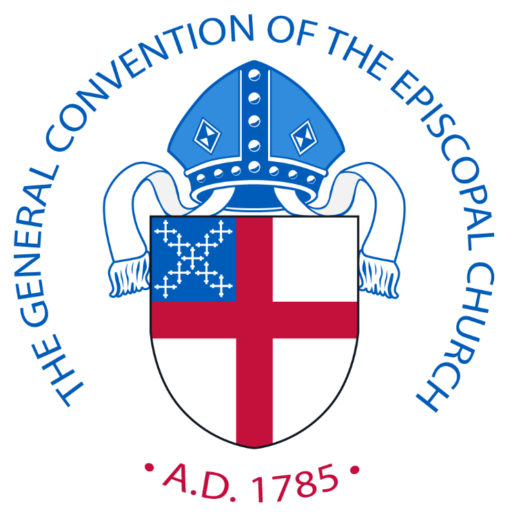
- Date: September 27 – October 7, 1785
- Duration: 10 days
- Venue: Christ Church, Philadelphia
- Location: Philadelphia, PA
- Type: General Convention of the Episcopal Church in the United States of America
- Organised by: The Episcopal Church
- Participants: House of Bishops, House of Deputies

The First General Convention of The Episcopal Church was held in 1785.

== Summary of events ==
The 1785 General Convention of the Episcopal Church marked the first gathering of the newly formed denomination in the United States, where representatives from several states convened to establish the church's structure, officially naming it the "Protestant Episcopal Church in the United States of America" and authorizing the creation of an American Prayer Book; this convention also set up a governing body with two houses, the House of Bishops and the House of Deputies, which remains the structure of the General Convention today.

=== Dioceses Represented ===
- Delaware
- New York
- New Jersey
- Pennsylvania
- South Carolina
- Virginia

== See also ==
- General Convention of the Episcopal Church in the United States of America
