= Rosemary E. Phelps =

American counseling psychologist

- Occupation: Professor of Psychology
- Awards: APA Award for Distinguished Contributions to Education and Training in Psychology (2010)

Academic background
- Education: Ohio State University; University of Tennessee

Academic work
- Institutions: University of Georgia

Rosemary Elaine Phelps (born 1955) is an American counseling psychologist whose work has focused on racial identity and the race-related stress experienced by racially diverse students and faculty in higher education. She is known for her advocacy and mentoring of students and faculty of color and her commitment to training counseling psychologists to be culturally responsive and competent. Phelps is professor and coordinator of undergraduate service courses in the Department of Human Counseling and Services at the University of Georgia.

Phelps received the American Psychological Association (APA) Distinguished Contributions to Education and Training Award in 2010, recognizing "her long-term commitment to the development of the Preparing Future Faculty program, her recruitment and retention of students of color, and her work in racial and ethnic identity development." In 2011, Phelps was named an APA Fellow through the Society for Counseling Psychology. In 2016, she was honored with a Career Achievement Award given to notable alumni of Ohio State University.

== Biography ==
Phelps was born in Fort Valley, Georgia in 1955 into a family of farmers in a rural section of Peach County. Phelps was brought up during the peak of the civil rights movement. Up until the seventh grade, she spent her academic career in all Black learning environments. At the start of eighth grade, she was one of five African American students chosen to attend Fort Valley High School as a result of federal mandates to desegregate schools in America. Despite being faced with the controversy and disadvantage of being one of a handful of black students in her school, she graduated in 1972 in the top 5% of her class, and was named one of the "most likely to succeed."

Phelps earned her Bachelor of Arts degree in psychology in 1976, and her Master of Arts degree in guidance and counseling in 1977, from Ohio State University. She completed a Ph.D. at the University of Tennessee in counseling psychology in 1986. Her dissertation, titled "A Study of the Perception of Verbal Aggression in Black and White Females" was mentored by Naomi Meara.

Phelps worked as an adjunct assistant professor, staff psychologist, and assistant professional specialist in the Psychology Department of the University of Notre Dame from 1986–1989. She joined the faculty of the University of Georgia in 1990 as an assistant professor. At the University of Georgia, Phelps secured funding for the 'Preparing Future Faculty in Psychology' program, which aimed to better prepare doctoral students, and especially students of color, for academic careers.

Phelps is a licensed psychologist in the state of Indiana. She previously chaired the Ethnic and Cultural Diversity Committee of APA, Division 17 (1990-1991) and served as president of the Southeastern Psychological Association (2018).

== Research ==
Phelps's dissertation research focused on racial differences in perceptions of verbal aggression. In this study, 80 Black women and 80 White women were asked to rate different situations in terms of how aggressive they were. The results displayed a clear difference between races, with White women viewing all of the scenarios as higher in aggression than Black women.

Phelps has conducted many studies related to her expertise in counseling psychology. One of her projects focused on university and college counseling centers as an option for new professionals in counseling psychology. Phelps examined the choice that many new counseling psychologists make on whether to begin their career in a school or university and reviewed professional and personal issues that may arise when opting to work in the education system. Through collaborative research projects, Phelps has addressed many topics of relevance to training counseling psychologists, including the personalization of career-related choices, implementation of the scientist-practitioner model, cultural competency, and social justice, while taking issues of race, gender, and social inequality into account.
