= Charles S. Boggs =

Charles Stewart Boggs
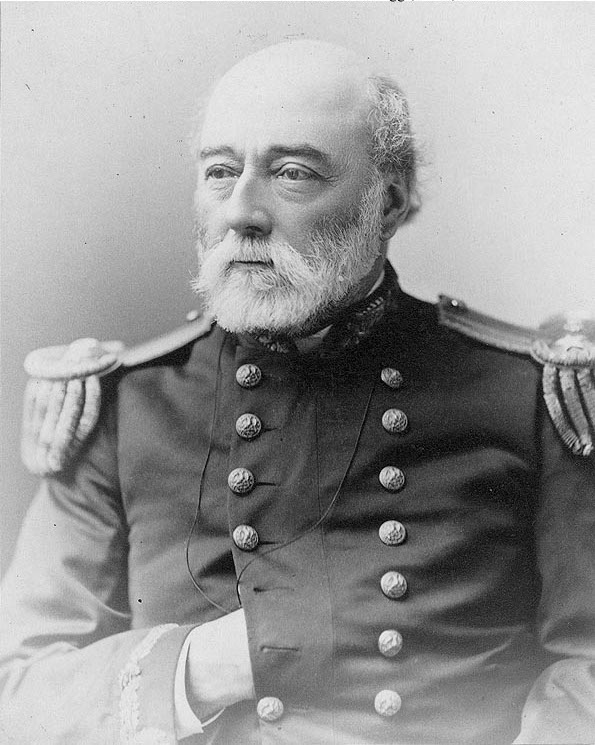
- Rear Admiral Boggs, USN, c. 1870
- Born: January 28, 1811
- Died: April 22, 1888 (aged 77)
- Burial place: Christ Church (Episcopal), New Brunswick, New Jersey, U.S.
- Military career
- Allegiance: United States of America
- Branch: United States Navy
- Service years: 1826–1873
- Rank: Rear admiral
- Commands: USS Varuna
- Conflicts: Mexican–American War; American Civil War

Rear Admiral Charles Stewart Boggs (28 January 1811 – 22 April 1888) served in the United States Navy during the Mexican–American War and the American Civil War.

== Early life and career ==
Boggs was born in New Brunswick, New Jersey. He was appointed a midshipman in November 1826 and was assigned to the Boston Navy Yard until 1830, when he began two years at sea on board the brig Porpoise.

For the rest of the 1830s and the 1840s he had duties ashore and afloat, receiving his commission as Lieutenant in 1837, while serving in the ship of the line North Carolina.

He was an officer in the steamer Princeton during the Mexican–American War and executive officer of the frigate St. Lawrence in 1851.

Promoted to the rank of Commander in 1855, Boggs commanded two mail steamers during the next four years and was a lighthouse inspector at San Francisco, California in 1860–1861.

== Civil War service ==
In December 1861 Boggs was given command of the gunboat Varuna. The following April, during the Capture of New Orleans, he commanded her with distinction:

In the attack of the squadron on the Mississippi forts, April 18–24 ... he destroyed six of the Confederate gunboats, but finally lost his own vessel, after driving his antagonist ashore in flames. When he found the Varuna sinking, he ran her ashore, tied her to the trees, and fought his guns until the water was over the guntracks.

Varuna was lost in the battle with 184 casualties. Receiving his Captain's commission in July 1862, during the rest of the American Civil War he was commanding officer of the steam sloops Juniata and Sacramento, with the North Atlantic Blockading Squadron, the steam cruiser Connecticut in the West Indies, and had special duty at the New York Navy Yard.

== Post-war service and last years ==
In 1866–68 Boggs commanded the gunboat De Soto. As a commodore, he had another tour of lighthouse inspection service in 1869–1870, receiving promotion to rear admiral during this time.

His final seagoing service was as commander of the European Fleet in 1871. Retired in January 1872, he remained on duty as Secretary of the Light House Board until mid-1873.

Rear Admiral Charles S. Boggs died at New Brunswick, New Jersey, on 22 April 1888. He is buried in the churchyard of Christ Episcopal Church.

== Namesake ==
The destroyer USS Boggs (DD-136) was named for him.
