= Bonnie Anderson (Episcopalian) =

American religious leader

Bonnie Anderson was the former president of the House of Deputies of the Episcopal Church in the United States of America. During her tenure, she was one of the two senior figures in the church, together with the Presiding Bishop.

She was first elected vice-president of the House of Deputies in 2004, and was subsequently elected as president in 2006 and re-elected in 2009. She opted not to run for re-election in 2012. She was noted for her efforts to support the role of laity in the governance of the church. She is from the Episcopal Diocese of Michigan, where she served as Canon to the Ordinary and president of the standing committee.

Anderson is a 1968 graduate of the University of the Pacific in Stockton, California and received M.S. and M.S.W. degrees from the University of Michigan. Anderson holds honorary Doctor of Divinity degrees from the Episcopal Divinity School and the University of the South (Sewanee), as well as honorary Doctor of Canon Law degrees from Seabury-Western Theological Seminary and the General Theological Seminary.
