= USS Boggs =

Wickes-class destroyer

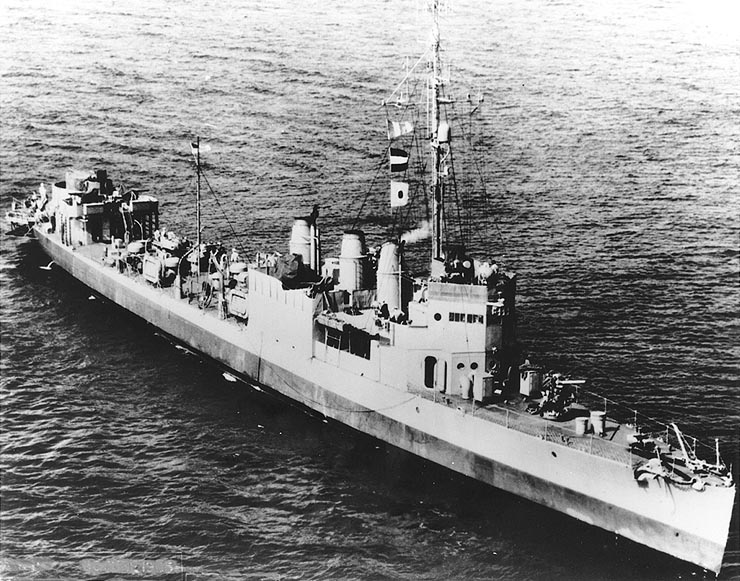
- USS Boggs in June 1945

History

United States
- Name: Boggs
- Namesake: Charles Boggs
- Builder: Mare Island Navy Yard
- Cost: $2,455,952.79 (hull & machinery)
- Laid down: 15 November 1917
- Launched: 25 April 1918
- Commissioned: 23 September 1918
- Decommissioned: 29 June 1922
- Reclassified: AG-19, 5 September 1931
- Recommissioned: 19 December 1931
- Decommissioned: 20 March 1946
- Reclassified: DMS-3, 19 November 1940; AG-19, 5 June 1945
- Stricken: 12 April 1946
- Fate: Sold for scrapping 27 November 1946

General characteristics
- Class & type: Wickes-class destroyer
- Displacement: 1,154 tons
- Length: 314 ft 5 in (95.8 m)
- Beam: 31 ft 9 in (9.7 m)
- Draft: 9 ft 0 in (2.7 m)
- Speed: 35 knots (65 km/h)
- Complement: 122 officers and enlisted
- Armament: 4 × 4 in (102 mm) guns; 1 × 3 in (76 mm) guns; 4 × triple 21 in (533 mm) torpedo tubes

USS Boggs (DD-136) was a Wickes-class destroyer in the United States Navy, later redesignated as AG-19 and then as DMS-3, and back again to AG-19. She was the first ship named for Admiral Charles Boggs.

== Construction and commissioning ==
Boggs was launched on 25 April 1918 by Mare Island Navy Yard, sponsored by Miss Ruth Hascal. The ship was commissioned on 23 September 1918.

== Service history ==
=== Pre-World War II ===
Boggs departed San Diego in March 1919 for a six-month cruise along the United States East Coast, in the North Atlantic, and in the Caribbean Sea. Upon her return she served with the Pacific Fleet until being placed out of commission on 29 June 1922. Redesignated a miscellaneous auxiliary (AG-19) on 5 September 1931, she was re-commissioned on 19 December 1931 and assigned to Mobile Target Division 1, Battle Force, for high-speed radio control tests, target towing, and minesweeping. Except for a cruise to the U.S. East Coast from January to October 1934, she served off the West Coast of the United States until 1940. She arrived at Pearl Harbor on 11 September 1940. Late in 1940, she was reclassified a high-speed minesweeper and received the new hull classification symbol DMS-3.

=== World War II ===
The Japanese attack on Pearl Harbor on 7 December 1941 found Boggs at sea, but she returned later in the day to sweep the approaches and anchorage. She remained at Pearl Harbor on minesweeping, patrol, and training duty until January 1943 when she made a run to Canton Island, Phoenix Islands, with supplies. She returned to Pearl Harbor on 2 March 1943, and for the next year served in the vicinity as a patrol vessel, minesweeper, and towboat. She served as a target towing vessel with the Operational Training Command out of San Diego (12 April 1944 – March 1945).

Following overhaul at San Pedro, Los Angeles, from March through June 1945, she was stripped of her sweeping gear and reclassified AG-19, 5 June 1945. Fitted for high-speed target towing, Boggs arrived at Eniwetok, Marshall Islands, via Pearl Harbor, on 15 August 1945. She remained at Eniwetok until 6 October 1945 and then returned to the United States, arriving in early 1946. Boggs was decommissioned on 20 March 1946 and sold for scrap on 27 November 1946.
