= Christ Church, New Brunswick, New Jersey =

Historic church in New Brunswick, New Jersey

Christ Church
- The Rector, Church Wardens, and Vestrymen of Christ Church in the City of New Brunswick
- Christ Episcopal Church
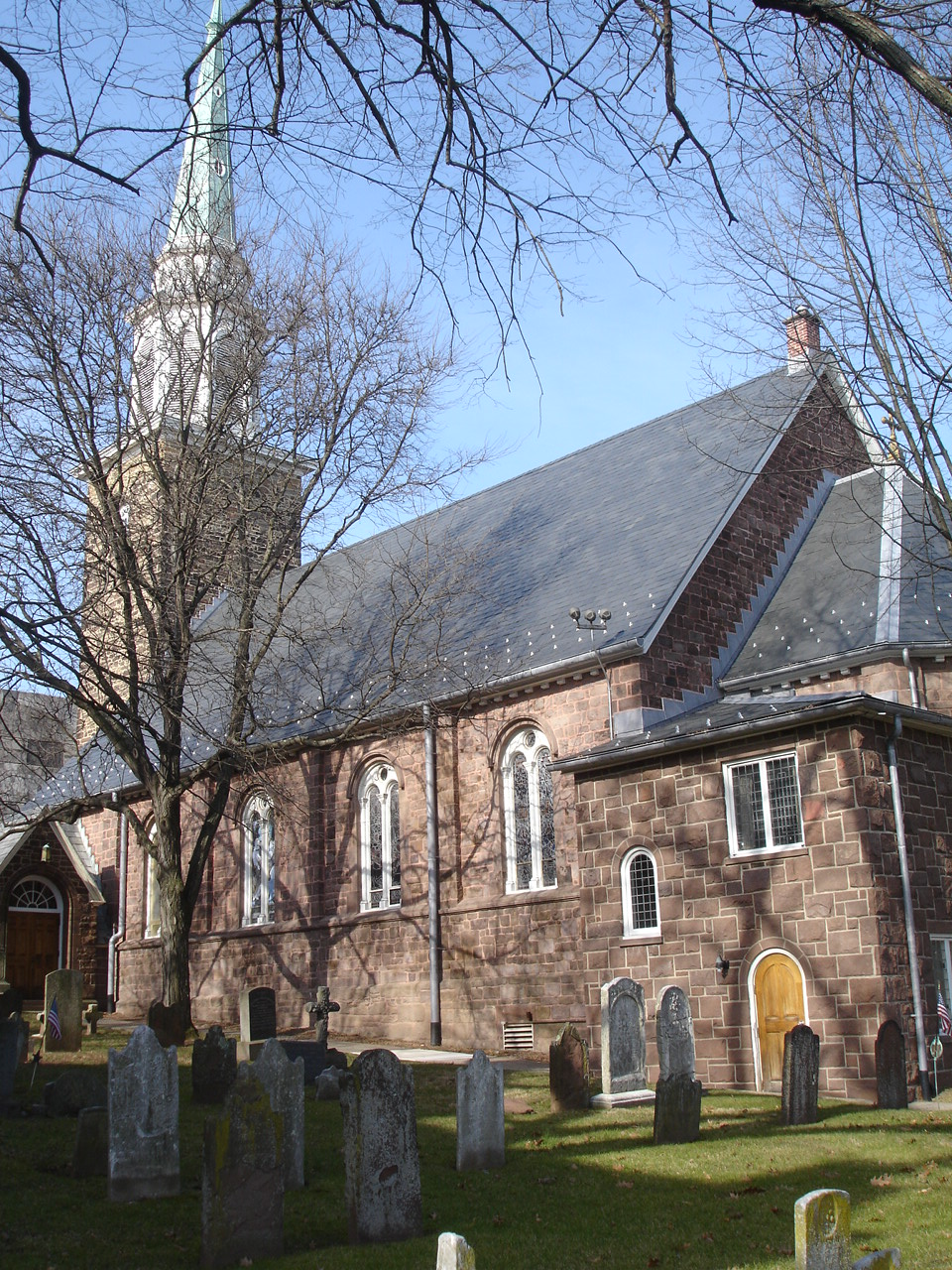

- Location of Christ Church; Middlesex County, NJ
- Location: New Brunswick, New Jersey
- Country: United States
- Denomination: Episcopal
- Website: christchurchnewbrunswick.org

History
- Status: Church
- Founded: 1761
- Events: Third public reading of the Declaration of Independence (which occurred in New Brunswick, July 8, 1776

Architecture
- Functional status: Active
- Architect(s): Philip French (1750 original); Henry Dudley & Frederick Wills (1852 rebuild)
- Architectural type: Mission parish
- Style: * Gothic Revival - church; * Federal; * Romanesque Revival - Parish House; * Italianate - Choir House, Sexton's House
- Years built: 1742–49
- Groundbreaking: 1742
- Completed: 1750

Specifications
- Materials: Sandstone rubble while the stone tower is composed of irregularly sized shaley sandstone rubble with a copper roof

Administration
- Province: Province II
- Diocese: Episcopal Diocese of New Jersey

Clergy
- Bishop: The Right Reverend Sally French
- Rector: Reverend Joanna P. Hollis
- Christ Episcopal Church
- U.S. National Register of Historic Places
- New Jersey Register of Historic Places
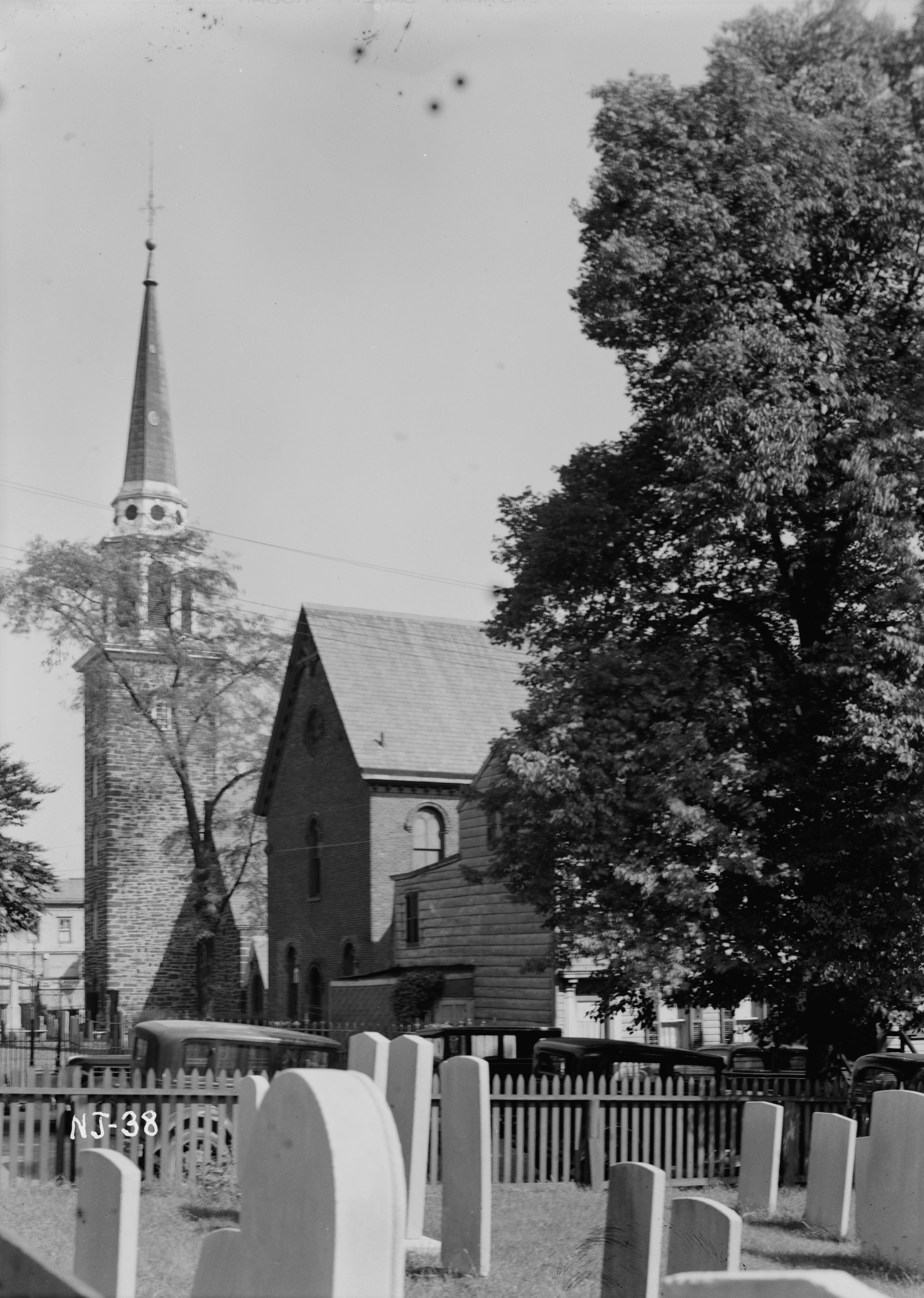
- Christ Church, from 1937 Buildings Survey
- Location: New Brunswick, New Jersey
- Coordinates: 40°29′44.03″N 74°26′36.55″W
- Area: 1.1 acres (0.45 ha)
- Built: 1750
- NRHP reference No.: 89000994
- NJRHP No.: 1857

Significant dates
- Added to NRHP: July 28, 1989
- Designated NJRHP: June 20, 1989

Christ Church or Christ Episcopal Church is a historic Episcopal church in New Brunswick, Middlesex County, New Jersey. The church reported 456 members in 2016 and 444 members in 2025. Plate and pledge income reported for the congregation in 2025 was $256,938. Average Sunday attendance (ASA) in 2025 was 61 persons, down from a reported 138 in 2015.

== History ==
In 1701 English minister Thomas Bray formed the Society for the Propagation of the Gospel in Foreign Parts (SPG) to minister to the new English settlers. In 1711 a group of Anglicans were holding service in an old broken down townhouse in Piscataway that they shared with a group of Baptists. Under the influence of William Skinner, an SPG minister, in 1717 a timber frame church was built, which was completed in 1724, to replace the broken down townhouse. St. James Parish in Piscataway continued to grow, including members from higher up the Raritan River in New Brunswick. The demand was so great that a group gathered in 1742 to construct another church, to be called Christ Church, on the New Brunswick side of the River.

Although construction began in 1742, title to the land was not obtained until 1745. This was because one of the original church planners was Philip French, who was the largest land owner in New Brunswick. French did not believe in selling land, but for public buildings that would benefit the community he did provide land leases at nominal rates. For the land to build Christ Church, he charged a yearly rent of "one peppercorn a year, only if asked." The lease for the land is still on display in the Rector's office at Christ Church. Throughout the early years, Christ Church remained a mission parish. It would not receive a royal charter as an independent parish until 1761.

== Pre– and post–American Revolution ==
While it was believed that the parish was fully behind fight for independence, the reality is that during the Revolution the parish was quite conflicted. Figures such as Col. John Neilson, and Brigadier General Anthony White did, in fact, fight on behalf of the Patriots. But the church also contained its share of Loyalists, such as John Antill, who fought with the 2nd Battalion of the New Jersey Volunteers (a Loyalist force).

One figure caught in the middle was the Rector, the Rev. Abraham Beach. Beach sympathized with the Patriots aims, but could not support rebellion as a means to the end. Moreover, as an Anglican cleric, he had taken oaths to support the Crown, and the liturgy included prayers for the King. One morning as he was preparing for service he was threatened with death if he offered such prayers, as a result of which he decided to close the church for the duration of the war. Being a faithful cleric and a moderate at heart, he continued his ministry even during the war, worshiping in the homes of sympathetic parishioners, and often deleting the prayers for the King if he thought such would offend delicate sensibilities.

Following the war, the political energies of the newly independent states were focused on forming "a more perfect union," first in the Articles of Confederation, later in the Constitution of the United States of America. The newly independent daughter churches of the Church of England also sought "a more perfect union," and foremost in the leadership was the same Abraham Beach. In the winter of 1783/84 he corresponded with William White (later the first Presiding Bishop of the Episcopal Church) and other clergy in Pennsylvania, New Jersey and New York soliciting a gathering to "consider the state of the church." He extended an invitation to meet at Christ Church May 11, 1784. The outgrowth of that meeting was a call for another meeting in October 1784 with representatives from all thirteen states to consider a general convention to manage the affairs of the newly independent church. The First General Convention met in September 1785, leading to the current shape of the church we now know: with equal voice and vote for bishops, clergy and laity, the beginnings of an American Book of Common Prayer, and our own national Constitution and Canons.

The parish acquired its first pipe organ in 1788 for $100. A choir was gathered in the early 19th century under the direction of Ann Croes, daughter of Bishop Croes. In 1826 Bishop Croes reported that "by the exertion of the ladies in the congregation the church has been furnished with a new and sweetly-toned organ, the largest in the Diocese" built by Henry Erben. A new organ by Erben replaced that instrument in 1842. In 1869 a new organ built by Levi Stuart was placed in the front of the church (now the Clarke Chapel).

== 19th century ==
The church was so comfortable financially that in 1852 the parish replaced 100-year-old structure and enlarged it, using (in part) many of the stones from the first building. Organ music has been part of parish life since the purchase of an organ in 1788, as was a volunteer parish choir, established in the early 19th century Read more here.. Under the leadership of the Reverend Elisha Brooks Joyce, successor of pastorate Alfred Stubbs, a choir of men and boys was established, replacing the paid quartet that had been established in the 1850s. Shortly after he became rector, Rev. Joyce appointed George Wilmot, Music Supervisor of the New Brunswick Public Schools as a professional chorister in 1885, and in 1894 he established a formally vested men and boys choir. The present Christ Church music program inherits the legacy established by Wilmot. Mr. Wilmot was a composition pupil of the English composer Joseph Barnby. Other notable musicians include John W. Durham, a pupil of Alexander Guillmant. Durham served as organist in the early 20th century, and his daughter Elizabeth was (at her death) the oldest living graduate of the New Jersey College for Women (now Douglass College, Rutgers University). Miss Durham established a number of music scholarships at the Mason Gross School of the Arts, Rutgers.

Stubbs supervised the construction of the "choir building" (Old Parish House), which was dedicated August 24, 1874. Joyce supervised the construction of the "new" Parish House on Paterson Street in 1897, still in use today. Its construction placed the parish deeply in debt, a debt passed on to his successor, Herbert Parrish. Father Parrish was a man of substantial financial acumen, and served St Michael and Angels, Baltimore—then one of the largest Episcopal Churches in the country. Joyce contracted tuberculosis and became a patient at Johns Hopkins Hospital in Baltimore, and Parrish served as his priest. After Parrish's election as rector, he worked with William Hopkins Leupp and James Parsons to establish an "endowment fund" for the parish—he also served as the church's treasurer. By the time he left after his 13-year pastorate, the previously debt-ridden parish had an investment fund totaling $250,000, a fund that enabled the parish to survive the Depression far more easily than more financially strapped churches.

Parrish also was committed to Sunday Schools as essential to faith development. This is most clearly seen in the establishment of the Highland Park Sunday School in 1921 (supported by funding from the will of William Leupp), which in time led to the founding of All Saints Episcopal Church in Highland Park, New Jersey. He was instrumental in the development of still another Episcopal parish in New Brunswick, St. Alban's Church. Other parishes established by Christ Church include St. Mark's in Carteret (now closed), St. Paul's in Bound Brook, St. John's in Somerville, and St. John the Evangelist, also in New Brunswick.

== The Modern Era ==
Parrish's successor, The Rev. Canon Walter Stowe, served the second longest pastorate in the church's history, 37 years (1929–66). It could also be argued that it was the second most tumultuous period (after the American Revolution). During his pastorate Stowe had to contend with the Great Depression, World War II, the Korean War, the beginnings of the Viet Nam War, the Civil Rights Movement, and the beginning of white flight to the suburbs. Due to Fr. Parrish's investment fund, the parish weathered the Depression relatively easily, but the Second World War was harder to avoid. The memorials around the building testify to the impact of the war on the parish. From all available evidence, at least 120 young men served in the war, of whom 10 never returned.

Following the war Stowe was instrumental in establishing the Episcopal chaplaincy at Rutgers. In 1949 two Episcopal members of the Rutgers' community, Clarence A. Lambelet (Professor of Engineering) and Jane Conlin (a senior at Douglass College, the Rutgers’ College for Women) set out to organize a Canterbury Club for 400 Episcopal students at Rutgers. They approached Stowe with the idea. The rector gave his backing to the plan and approached the Procter Foundation for financial support. With such support Clarence W. Sickles, a new curate, was hired for Christ Church, who began his service to both the church and the Episcopal ministry in September 1951.

The parish's second-longest serving musician, George Huddleston, arrived in 1930 and conducted the Choir of Men and Boys until his retirement in 1974. He was followed by Clifford Hill, Jr. who led the music program until 1990. Under Mr. Hill's direction, the adult choir admitted women and a Royal School of Church Music (RSCM) chorister program was established under the direction Martha Ainsworth (Para). One of the choristers from that period, T.J. Harper, is currently Associate Professor of Music and Director of Choral Activities at Loyola Marymount University in Los Angeles, California.

Stowe's immediate successor, Charles Gomph Newbery, came to Christ Church from All Saints Church in Princeton, but only remained three years (1966–69). Reflecting the liturgical changes that were occurring elsewhere in the church, Fr. Newbery instituted a number of changes in the worship space. A freestanding altar was installed, and the semi-circular choir stalls were built in the chancel. The Clarke Chapel was established, and the old altar moved there. The sacristy was also added. The current shape of the church is attributable to him. Given the social upheavals of the day, he also established an outreach to the neighborhood, beginning an English as a Second Language program.

The Rev. Joan Fleming served as Rector from 1993 until 2004. She exercised a regular ministry of parish visitation, and deliberately extended invitations to all, Black and white alike. She initiated the first Black Heritage Celebration in 1994—a tradition that continues to this day. She also created programming to address the heritage of all, Italian Night, International Night. Her diocesan initiative, "Unlearning Racism," was first offered at Christ Church. Under her leadership, Mark Trautman was engaged as Director of Music in 1994 and served until 2010. He incorporated jazz and gospel music, introduced the Lift Every Voice and Sing II Hymnal in 2006, and developed a full-time choral program that included annual concerts, Evensongs, Interfaith choral concerts involving city churches, as well as the Muslim and Jewish community, and many other events; he also commissioned the church's Richards, Fowkes and Company organ in 1997. Under Trautman's leadership, the choir sang at the State Theatre in New Brunswick in 2008 and 2009 with the New Brunswick Chamber Orchestra.

In 2001, the Richards, Fowkes and Company delivered its opus 12 organ to Christ Church. It is one of the most significant mechanical action pipe organs in the northeast, and is used regularly by the organ students from the Mason Gross School of the Arts at Rutgers, the State University of New Jersey. Recitalists from around the world have praised the instrument, and it has been recorded on a compact disc by Aart Bergwerff, organist from the Netherlands.

== Area influence ==
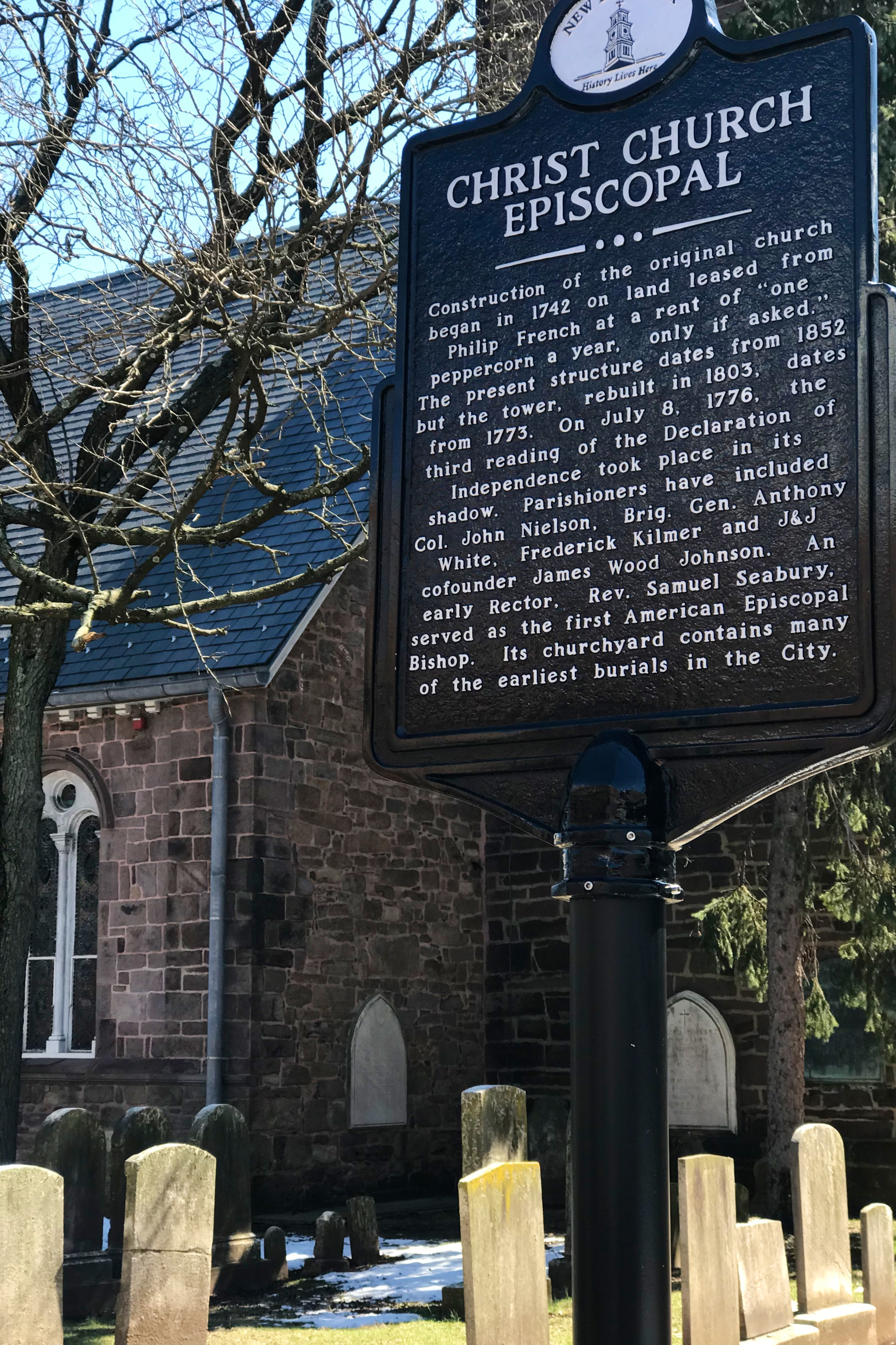
Area information sign

=== Prestige ===
For most of the 19th and the early 20th centuries Christ Church was an establishment church. It could be described truthfully as the “Johnson and Johnson Church.” Among its members were James Wood Johnson (co-founder of Johnson and Johnson), Frederick Barnett Kilmer (father of poet Joyce Kilmer and research chemist for Johnson and Johnson), and Walter Williams (the President of Johnson and Johnson International). Other members were part of the economic and political elite (such as Nicholas Gouveneur Rutgers, President of the New Brunswick Savings Bank; Grace Wells, founder of what is now Robert Wood Johnson University Hospital, and Fred DeVoe, former Speaker of the New Jersey Assembly). The present parish is less politically connected and more solidly middle class. Christ Church is also one of the first Episcopal parishes in the United States to have an organized choral program, including paid professional musicians, since the early 19th century.

=== Race, war, and the modern era ===
For much of its history Christ Church saw itself as a white church. In its earliest days, enslaved Black people were evangelized, but baptism did nothing to emancipate them. Existing parish records include 26 baptisms of known enslaved people, owned by parish members (including two rectors, Abraham Beach and John Croes). There may, of course, have been others, but records do not exist.

Blacks were members of the church but they were not seated with the whites. In the 19th and early 20th centuries, blacks were seated in the gallery, along with those who could not afford pew rents. When pew rents were abolished in the early 1920s, the decision was made to relocate the organ from the chancel to the gallery, displacing the Black members of the church. Taking that as an indication they were not particularly welcome, the displaced African American members formed their own parish, St. Alban's Episcopal Church in New Brunswick, a predominantly Afro-Anglican mission, which still exists.

The racial nature of the parish did not change much for half a century, but beginning in the mid-1970s, the composition of the church would be transformed. Blacks who moved into the city from other areas (including many from the Caribbean and African countries) joined the church. The church during this period has been described as not particularly welcoming to newcomers, but this was especially so for persons of color. Some parishioners would not shake their hands during the peace, and all but told them their place was at St. Alban's.

Two persons in particular helped to change this dynamic. The Reverend Canon Frank Carthy served with great distinction from 1970-1986, and was instrumental in making connections with the city and greater community. The Reverend Martin Gutwein, a curate under Canon Frank Carthy, had served in the Peace Corps knew the family members of some of the new members and made them feel welcome. With his acceptance, some of the veteran members of the parish invited more and more of the newcomers into existing parish ministries.

The current Interim Rector of Christ Church is the Rev. D. Scott Russell, who has served since 2026.

== Notable burials ==
Christ Church Graveyard
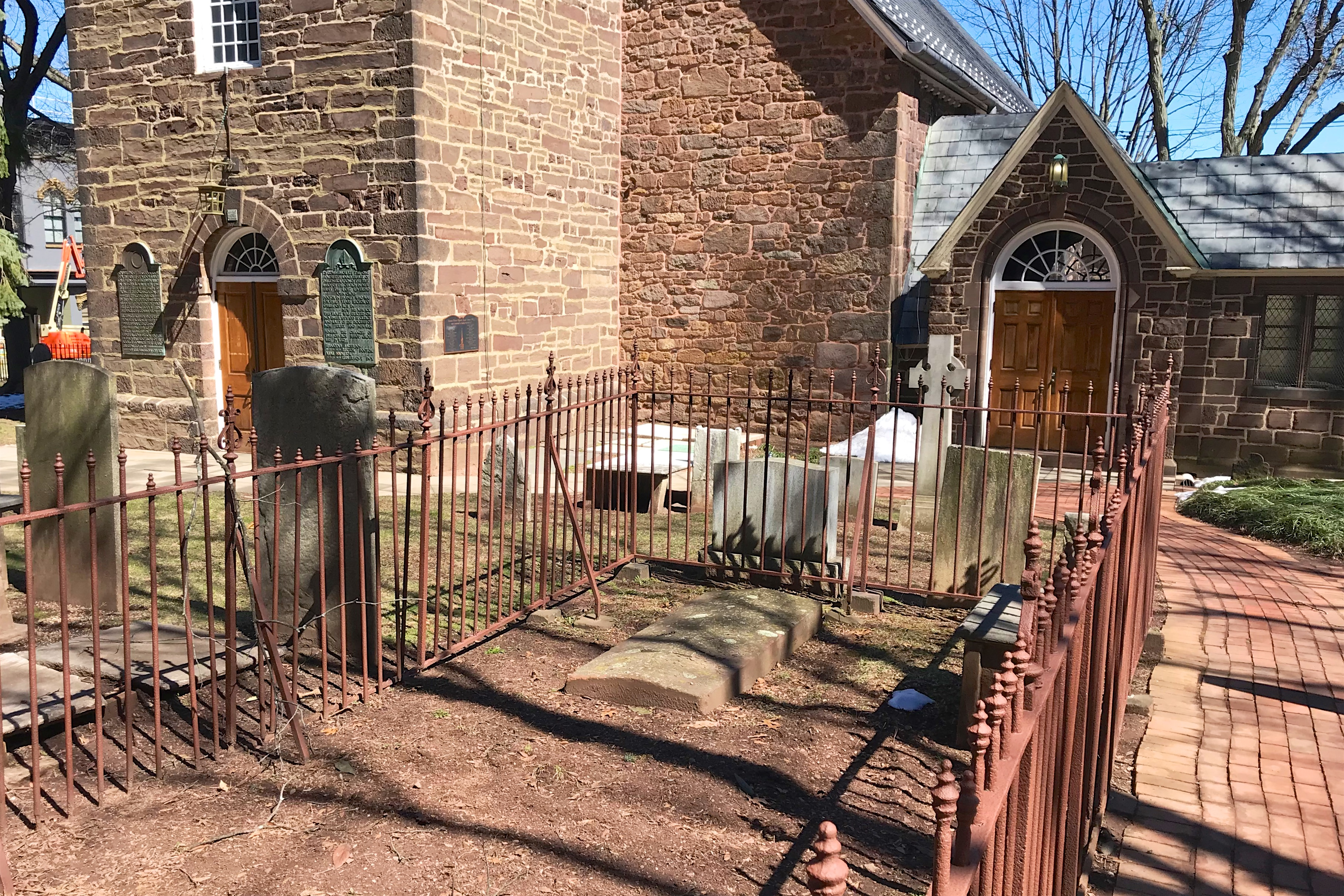
- Gravesite of the Rev. Abraham Beach
- Interactive map of Christ Church Graveyard

Details
- Established: 1754
- Location: New Brunswick, New Jersey
- Country: United States
- Type: Church
- Owned by: Christ Church New Brunswick
- No. of interments: 1,253
- Website: Christ Church New Brunswick Graveyard

- The Reverend Abraham Beach (1740–1828) – rector of Christ Church from 1767 to 1784, his grave lies within an iron fence along with the graves of his daughter Hannah Rattoone (1770–1848) and grandson Isaac Lawrence (1811–1811).
- John Croes (1762–1832) – rector of Christ Church from 1801 to 1832 and first Bishop of the Diocese of New Jersey, is buried beneath the altar in the sanctuary, but the grave of his wife, Martha is near a walkway on the west side of the church, along with his daughter, Ann, who served as the first choir director in the early 19th century.
- Brigadier General Anthony Walton White – served as an aide-de-camp to George Washington in the American Revolution. His grave site is near the door to the sanctuary.
- Adm. Charles Stuart Boggs (1811–1888) – Served upon the steamer "Princeton" during the Mexican–American War and was present during the Siege of Veracruz. Later ordered to the gun boat "Varuna" where he fought with distinction during the Capture of New Orleans. Promoted to rear admiral in 1870.

== See also ==
- National Register of Historic Places listings in Middlesex County, New Jersey
- List of Episcopal churches in the United States
