= Abraham Beach =

American Episcopalian clergyman

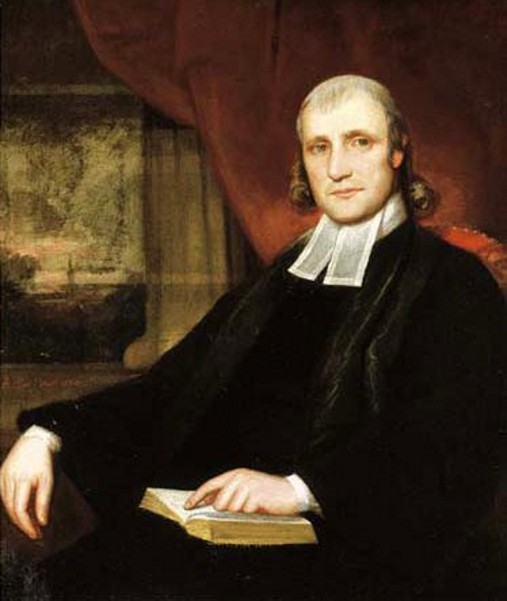
- portrait by Ralph Earl
- Born: September 9, 1740; Cheshire
- Died: September 14, 1828 (aged 88); New Brunswick
- Resting place: Christ Church Episcopal Churchyard
- Alma mater: Yale College
- Occupation: Minister
- Spouse(s): Ann Van Wickle
- Children: Cornelia Beach, Hannah Beach
- Parent(s): Elnathan Beach; Hannah Bull

Abraham Beach (September 9, 1740 – September 14, 1828) was an American Episcopalian clergyman.

He was born in Cheshire, Connecticut. He was the only child of Elnathan Beach and his second wife, the sister of David Wooster.

Beach graduated from Yale College in 1757 with the honors of the valedictory, became a convert to the Episcopal faith. He studied theology under Dr. Samuel Johnson and his relative, John Beach. After graduation, Beach first engaged in trade and worked in the army as a sutler.

In 1767, Beach went to England, and there received ordination to the priesthood. He was appointed missionary to New Brunswick, and entered upon his work in September, 1767. During the American Revolutionary War his position between the two armies was exceedingly embarrassing. In consequence his church, Christ Church, was closed, and he did not officiate until December, 1781, when, in accordance with the suggestions of the Archbishop of Canterbury, it became permissible to conduct public worship with the omission of the prayers for the king and parliament. In 1784 he became the assistant minister of Trinity Church in New York, and continued an active worker in the diocese of New York until 1813. He was on many occasions a delegate to the General Convention of the Episcopal Church, and in 1801, 1804, and 1810 was president of the house of lay and clerical delegates. Of Rutgers College, established in 1770 at New Brunswick, he was an early trustee. In 1786 he was elected a regent of the University of the State of New York, and in 1787 a trustee of Columbia College, from which institution he received the honorary degree of D. D. in 1789. He was likewise actively associated with many of the benevolent institutions of New York. Subsequent to his resignation from Trinity parish he retired to his farm on Raritan River, near New Brunswick, where he resided until his death. His only publications were sermons.

Abraham Beach near New Brunswick and is buried in the Christ Church Episcopal Churchyard.
