= Pamela Pauly Chinnis =

American Episcopal Church leader

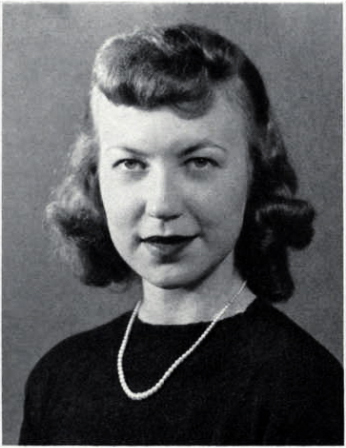

President of the House of Deputies
- In office 1991–2000
- Vice President: George Werner (1994-2000); Wallace A. Frey (1991-1994)
- Preceded by: The Rev. David Collins
- Succeeded by: The Rev. George Werner

Vice-President of the House of Deputies
- In office 1986–1991
- Preceded by: Charles Radford Lawrence
- Succeeded by: Wallace A. Frey

Personal details
- Born: August 12, 1925 Galena, Missouri, U.S.
- Died: August 24, 2011 (aged 86) Virginia Beach, Virginia, U.S.
- Resting place: Galena, Missouri, U.S.
- Spouse: Carter Cabell Chinnis Sr
- Relations: Dewey Short (uncle)
- Education: College of William & Mary; Phi Beta Kappa Society

Pamela Pauly Chinnis (August 12, 1925 – August 24, 2011) was the first woman to serve as president of the House of Deputies, one of two houses, with the House of Bishops, that makes up the General Convention of the Episcopal Church in the United States of America. She served three three-year terms, elected in 1991, 1994 and 1997.

Pamela Chinnis was born Mary Permelia Pauly in Galena, Missouri and graduated Phi Beta Kappa from the College of William and Mary in 1946. After moving to Washington, D.C. in 1948, Chinnis joined and served in leadership positions at the Episcopal Church of the Epiphany. Her growing involvement in the Episcopal Church included election as president of the diocesan chapter of Episcopal Church Women, serving as presiding officer of the national ECW's Triennial Meeting in 1976.

Chinnis served in a wide variety of church organizations, including the cathedral chapter of Washington National Cathedral, vice president of Province 3, the mid-Atlantic region of the Episcopal Church, vice chairwoman of Executive Council, which governs the church between General Conventions, and vice president of General Convention.

Chinnis also has served as a member or delegate to numerous Anglican and ecumenical bodies:

- Delegate to the Faith and Order Commission of the World Council of Churches, Bangalore, India, 1978
- Delegate to the Anglican Consultative Council, Canada (1979), Singapore (1987), Wales (1990), Cape Town (1993); standing committee, 1987 - 1993
- Member of ACC delegation to Lambeth Conference, 1988
- General Board, National Council of Churches, 1988 - 2000
- Led Episcopal delegation to 8th Assembly, World Council of Churches, Harare, Zimbabwe, 1998; elected to Central Committee
- Plenary, Consultation on Church Union, 1999

She was a member of Mortar Board (Virginia Alpha chapter at the College of William & Mary). She volunteered as editor of the Mortar Board Quarterly for seven years in the 1960s. For 13 years through 1983 Chinnis was trustee and treasurer of the Mortar Board National Foundation.

Chinnis died of pneumonia at her home in Virginia Beach, Virginia, on August 24, 2011. She was buried in Galena Cemetery, located in Galena, Missouri, on September 3, 2011.

Chinnis' uncle was U.S. Representative, Dewey Short.
