= Texas Law Review =

- Discipline: Law review
- Language: English

Publication details
- History: 1922–present
- Publisher: The Texas Law Review Association (United States)
- Frequency: 7/year

Standard abbreviations
- Bluebook: Tex. L. Rev.
- ISO 4: Tex. Law Rev.

Indexing
- ISSN: 0040-4411
- LCCN: 25019317
- OCLC no.: 1767356

Links
- Journal homepage; Online access

The Texas Law Review is a student-edited and -produced law review affiliated with the University of Texas School of Law (Austin). The Review publishes seven issues per year, six of which include articles, book reviews, essays, commentaries, and notes. The seventh issue is traditionally its symposium issue, which is dedicated to articles on a particular topic. The Review also publishes the Texas Law Review Manual on Usage & Style and the Texas Rules of Form: The Greenbook, both currently in their sixteenth editions. The Texas Law Review is wholly owned by a parent corporation, the Texas Law Review Association, rather than by the school. The Review is the 11th most cited law journal in the United States according to HeinOnline's citation ranking.

Admission to the Review is obtained through a "write-on" process at the end of each academic year. Well over half of each class applies for admission every year and approximately fifty are invited to join. Those selected students join the students from the previous year to form the Review's membership. About twenty of these students constitute the editorial board, which is selected early each spring semester.

The Texas Law Review was established in December 1922 by Leon A. Green, Ira P. Hildebrand, and Ireland Graves. Its Bluebook abbreviation is Tex. L. Rev. but abbreviates itself by its own editorial convention as Texas L. Rev.

== Notable alumni ==
- Linda L. Addison, Partner-in-Charge, New York, Fulbright & Jaworski
- James Baker, former United States Secretary of State, Secretary of the Treasury & White House Chief of Staff
- Lisa Blatt, Chair of Williams & Connolly’s Supreme Court and Appellate practice
- Marian Oldfather Boner, legal scholar
- William Curtis Bryson, United States Court of Appeals for the Federal Circuit
- Jerry Buchmeyer, United States District Judge, Northern District of Texas
- Greg Coleman, first solicitor-general of Texas
- Ben Clarkson Connally, former Chief Judge, United States District Court, Southern District of Texas
- Gregg Costa, United States Court of Appeals for the Fifth Circuit
- Finis E. Cowan, former United States District Judge, Southern District of Texas
- Lloyd Doggett, United States Congressman, Former Justice of the Texas Supreme Court
- Walter Raleigh Ely Jr., former Judge, United States Court of Appeals for the Ninth Circuit
- David Frederick, appellate attorney; has argued cases before the United States Supreme Court
- Bryan A. Garner, editor in chief of Black's Law Dictionary, coauthor with Justice Antonin Scalia on Reading Law and Making Your Case
- Thomas Gibbs Gee, United States Court of Appeals for the Fifth Circuit
- Joe R. Greenhill, former Justice & Chief Justice of the Texas Supreme Court
- James Wesley Hendrix, United States District Judge, Northern District of Texas
- Harry Lee Hudspeth, Chief United States District Judge, Western District of Texas
- Edith Jones, Chief Judge, United States Court of Appeals for the Fifth Circuit
- George P. Kazen, United States District Judge, Southern District of Texas
- W. Page Keeton, former Dean of The University of Texas School of Law and author of Prosser & Keeton on Torts
- Robert Keeton, United States District Judge, District of Massachusetts
- Baine Kerr, former President, Pennzoil, Inc.
- Robert Lanier, Former Mayor of Houston
- Stephen Susman (1941-2020), plaintiffs attorney and a founding partner of Susman Godfrey
- Diane Wood, United States Court of Appeals for the Seventh Circuit
