= Marian Oldfather Boner =

American legal scholar

- Born: June 25, 1909; Cleburne, Texas
- Died: April 2, 1983 (aged 73); Austin, Texas
- Education: B.A., M.A., LLB., University of Texas at Austin
- Years active: 1955–1981
- Known for: director of the Texas State Law Library
- Spouse: C. P. Boner (m. 1930–1978)
- Children: 3
- Parent(s): Henry and Berta Oldfather

Marian Oldfather Boner (June 25, 1909 – April 2, 1983) was an American legal scholar. She was the first director of the Texas State Law Library and sat on the editorial board of the Texas Law Review.

== Personal life ==
Oldfather was born on June 25, 1909, to parents Henry and Berta Oldfather. She married C. P. Boner in 1930 and together they had three children. Beginning in 1936, the family lived in a house that was specifically built for C. P. Boner, his aunt, and Oldfather.

== Career ==
After marrying Boner, she found life boring as a housewife. With all her children enrolled in school, she decided to re-enter the University of Texas at Austin. Her thesis in physics was titled "A study of the distortion produced by non-linear vacuum tubes." While earning her LLB., she sat on the editorial board of the Texas Law Review. She was also president of the Mortar Board and Lanier Society.

After earning her LLB., Boner became a reference librarian and assistant professor at the Tarlton Law Library after working under the supervision of Judge Robert Stayton. In 1961, she was appointed to the Committee on Index of Legal Periodicals. Boner was later elected vice president of the Southwestern Association of Law Libraries, which she served for one term from 1969 to 1970. She later became an associate professor of law and by 1972, she was a librarian at the Texas State Law Library. That year, she was also elected the first director of the Texas State Law Library, which she served until 1981. She was offered the position of director after the retirement of Frances Horton. In her first two years, she doubled the size of the libraries professional staff, updated their equipment, and took on legal cases that normally were the responsibility of the State Bar. While sitting as director, Boner also began to transcribe documents of the "Decisions From the 1845 Term Of the Republic of Texas Supreme Court," but she died before its completion.

In 1979, Boner was elected chair of the American Association of Law Libraries's Constitution and By-Laws Committee. She was also a board member and later Chair of the Ethics Commission.

She died on April 2, 1983.
