= Tara Welch =

American professor of Classics

- Occupation: Classics professor

Academic background
- Education: University of Southern California (BA); Oxford University (MA); University of California, Los Angeles (Ph.D.)

Tara Welch (née Silvestri) is an American professor of classics at the University of Kansas. She is the author of two books, The Elegiac Cityscape (2005) and Tarpeia (2015); she also served as a co-editor for Oxford Readings in Propertius (Oxford Readings in Classical Studies) (2012).

Welch received her bachelor's degree from University of Southern California in 1990, majoring in Latin and Greek. In 1989, she was chosen as a Rhodes Scholar. She earned a master's degree in 1993 from Oxford University and a Ph.D. from the University of California, Los Angeles in 1999.

While at USC, she was a member of Phi Beta Kappa and as well as the Mortar Board. Welch has been a member of the Society for Classical Studies, Classical Association of the Middle West and South, the International Plutarch Society, and the Women's Classical Caucus.

== Bibliography ==
=== As author ===
- The Elegiac Cityscape: Propertius and the Meaning of Roman Monuments. Columbus, Ohio: Ohio State University Press. 2005. ISBN 9780814210093.
- Tarpeia: Workings of a Roman Myth. Columbus, Ohio: Ohio State University Press. 2015. ISBN 9780814212813.

=== As editor ===
- Oxford Readings in Propertius. Oxford Readings in Classical Studies. Oxford, UK: Oxford University Press. 2012. ISBN 9780199563043. (Co-edited by Ellen Greene)
