= Naomi Meara =

American psychologist, researcher and academic

Naomi M. Meara
- Born: February 26, 1937; Columbus, Ohio, U.S.
- Died: February 28, 2007 (aged 70); South Bend, Indiana, U.S.
- Education: Ohio State University
- Known for: Application of virtue ethics in psychology
- Scientific career
- Fields: Psychology, Counseling Psychology
- Workplaces: University of Notre Dame
- Doctoral advisor: Lyle Schmidt

Naomi Meara (February 26, 1937 – February 28, 2007) was an American psychologist, researcher and academic. She is best known for her scholarship in virtue ethics and ethical decision making for psychologists, her work with Harold Pepinsky in describing and analyzing the language of therapy, and her contributions to the advancement of women within the field of psychology. She served as professor (1986-2002) and chair (1988–91) in the Psychology Department at Notre Dame University, where she was the first Nancy Reeves Dreux Professor of Psychology. She was a fellow of the American Psychological Association (APA), where she served as president of the Counseling Psychology Division, Division 17 (1989). She served on the editorial board of Journal of Counseling Psychology, The Counseling Psychologist, and a number of other journals, and was an active participant in the accreditation process for counseling psychology graduate programs operated by the APA.

== Early life and education ==
Meara was born in Columbus, Ohio, on February 26, 1937. Both of her parents, Joseph R. Meara and Naomi Conway Meara, were public school teachers as well as graduates of Ohio State University. She had one brother, Joseph F. Meara, who became a physician. Meara graduated from St. Mary of the Springs Academy in 1954, an all-women's Catholic high school run by the Dominican Sisters, and received a B.A. (1958) in English (with a minor in psychology), and a B.Sc. (1960) in education from The Ohio State University. As an undergraduate, she was selected as a member of the National College Senior Honor Society, the Mortar Board, where Dr. Pauline Pepinsky, a chapter advisor, mentored her in undergraduate student leadership. Meara notes that Pepinsky and her husband, Harold R. Pepinsky, were her first mentors in psychology. Although intent on earning an advanced degree, she found English less than captivating, and instead enrolled in a M.A. program in personnel administration at Syracuse University, graduating in 1962.

Meara appreciated student personnel work, but she found she preferred writing, teaching, administration and policy-making. Prompted by her experience with Pauline Pepinsky and her interest in working with people, she began to consider a degree in psychology. While employed as a residence hall director at the University of Illinois (1962–65), she approached Lyle Schmidt at Ohio State, who encouraged her to take summer classes in the counseling psychology program, which she did in both 1963 and 1964. She enrolled full-time in 1965 and, with Schmidt as her major advisor, graduated with a PhD in counseling psychology from The Ohio State University in 1967.

Meara credited four mentors during her time at Ohio State: Pauline Pepinsky (see above) who taught her "how to help others think and discover who they were"; Schmidt, who passed on to her a lifelong interest in ethics; Ruth Weimer Mount, Ohio State's associate dean of women, who "helped her to understand and become skilled in organizational leadership"; and Harold Pepinsky, who helped her develop her impressive skills in analysis, research and writing. She would go on to conduct research and publish with both Schmidt and Harold Pepinsky during her professional career.

== Academic and professional career ==
Meara's first appointment after graduation was to the faculty of the University of Wisconsin at La Crosse as an assistant and associate professor (1967–70). While there, she researched, with Robert M. Jackson and Manmohan Arora, the relationship between father identification and rural boys career goals and achievement. She returned to Ohio State for two years as a visiting senior research associate in the Department of Computer and Information Science, working with Harold Pepinsky and others to analyze natural language in counseling using computers. That same year, she was elected to the APA Council of Representatives as the Division 17 (Counseling Psychology) representative.

From 1972 to 1979, Meara was on the faculty of Ohio Dominican College in Columbus, OH, serving the Department of Psychology as associate professor and later chairperson. During this same period, she was an active member of the Division 17 Women's Committee (1974–84) and was elected to serve as Treasurer of Division 17 (1978–81).

Kathleen Davis reports recruiting Meara to the University of Tennessee in Knoxville in 1979 as associate (and later full) professor. She notes that both faculty and students at Knoxville had demonstrated a strong interest in developing a PhD program in counseling psychology. Meara was able to catalyze that interest and unite the faculty in its efforts, and the program was accredited by the APA in 1980. Meara served as program director for the first five years. During this same time frame, she was also chosen as Chair of the APA's Council of Counseling Psychology Training Programs (1980–81).

Meara was invited to join the faculty at the University of Notre Dame in 1986, remaining there until her retirement in 2002. During her career at Notre Dame, she served as Chair of the Department of Psychology (1988-1991), Bearer of the ceremonial mace (1993-1994), and in 1996 was named to an endowed chair as the first Nancy Reeves Dreux Professor of Psychology. She also served as Chair of APA's Division 17's Fellowship Committee (1985–86) and president of the APA's Division 17 (1988–89).

== Research ==
Meara was a highly productive scholar, with a wide range of interests. She is listed in the top 5% of contributors to the Personnel and Guidance Journal/Journal of Counseling & Development from 1978 to 1993, as well as one of the most productive members of the Counseling Psychology Division of APA between 1974 and 1991. While a full bibliography of Meara's published works is beyond the scope of this article, the following is intended to outline her most important contributions.

Some of Meara's earliest research interests were in human learning, and one of her first publications, A Time to Learn: A Guide to Academic and Personal Effectiveness, written with Phillip Bandt and Lyle Schmidt, provided college students with skills and practice to enhance their learning.

Meara carried her interest in learning into the counseling and psychotherapy setting. Returning to Ohio State as a visiting senior research associate in the Department of Computer and Information Science, she worked with Harold Pepinsky and others to develop and use an early computer system, CALAS (Computer-assisted Language Analysis System), for analyzing natural language in counseling. This work resulted in a series of papers regarding the language of counselors and their clients, showing, for example, how the linguistic styles of three psychotherapists (Carl Rogers, Fritz Perls, and Albert Ellis) differed significantly from each other.

Meara's interest and research in the language of counseling extended beyond that project, however. In 1982, she published with Wycoff, Davis and Hector "A Language Analysis of Empathic Responding to Client Anger", which made clear significant differences between low- and high- empathy counselors' linguistic behavior, pointing out that low-empathy counselors asked "significantly more questions". The value of this kind of detailed examination of the therapeutic process was noted in the Annual Review of Psychology as "moving beyond global questions of outcome and focusing on specific ingredients of the change process. As we understand those specifics better, enhancement of outcome will fall into place."

Meara also produced a number of studies around the topic of anger and verbal aggression. In 1991 for example, Meara, Rosemary Phelps, Kathleen L. Davis and Michael J. Patton conducted a study comparing African American and white women's perceptions of verbal aggression. They found that white women viewed episodes of verbal aggression as more aggressive than their African American counterparts, pointing to significant differences in socialization around verbal behaviors. No other main effects were found, regardless of the race of the participants.

During her time at Wisconsin, Meara published research, with Robert M. Jackson and Manmohan Arora, on the relationship between rural fathers' adequacy as models for identification and their adolescent sons' career goals and achievement. She and Jackson later published five- and ten-year follow-up research showing that "the occupational and educational achievements and aspirations" of sons whose fathers had been judged as providing adequate modeling were "significantly higher" than for those judged less than adequate.

Meara's signal contribution to her field, however, came in the area of ethics. Through a series of seminal papers, she introduced the concept of virtue ethics to the counseling psychology field, explained how it was to be distinguished from principle ethics, and provided useful approach for ethical decision making in counseling, providing way of addressing. Virtue ethics emphasizes the importance of personal characteristics or virtues for ethical therapists. Although it has been criticized (e.g. by Donald N. Bersoff) as irrelevant, redundant and potentially idiosyncratic, virtue ethics addresses deficiencies in consequentialism and deontological ethics decision-making processes.

In her paper "Just and Virtuous Leaders and Organizations" (2001), she argued for the importance of a virtue ethics perspective in any conversation about moral aspects of organizational justice. She pointed out the need to focus on the character of those who distribute justice, and how the goals of an organization influence its salient virtues. She also warned about the need to understand organizational justice from the perspectives of those who are non-Western and least powerful.

Meara also contributed substantially to the advancement of women in counseling psychology. She joined the Division 17 Women's Committee (1974–84), reviewing that committee's accomplishments with L.W. Harmon in 1989. She published a number of pieces examining the needs of women and career, including "Contemporary developments in women's career counseling: Themes of the past, puzzles for the future", "Occupational possible selves: Fears and aspirations of college women", "The working lives of women from lower socioeconomic backgrounds: Assessing prospects, enabling success" and "Motivational attributes of occupational possible selves for low-income rural women".

== Selected bibliography ==
- Bandt, P. L., Meara, N. M., & Schmidt, L. D. (1974). A time to learn: a guide to academic and personal effectiveness. New York: Holt, Rinehart and Winston.
- Chalk, L. M., Meara, N. M., Day, J. D., & Davis, K. L. (2005). Occupational possible selves: fears and aspirations of college women. Journal of Career Assessment, 13(2), 188-203.
- Harmon, Lenore W. & Meara, Naomi M. (1994). Contemporary developments in women's career counseling: Themes of the past, puzzles for the future. In: Walsh, W. Bruce & Osipow, Samuel H. (Eds.). (1994). Career counseling for women. Hillsdale, NJ: Lawrence Erlbaum Associates, Inc. pp. 355–367.
- Hurndon, C. J., Pepinsky, H. B., & Meara, N. M. (1979). Conceptual level and structural complexity in language. Journal of Counseling Psychology, 16, 190-197.
- Jackson, R. M., Meara, N. M., & Arora, M. (1974). Father identification, achievement, and occupational behavior of rural youth. Journal of Vocational Behavior, 4(1), 85-96.
- Jackson, R. M., & Meara, N. M. (1977). Father identification, achievement, and occupational behavior of rural youth: 5-year follow-up. Journal of Vocational Behavior, 10(1), 82-91.
- Jackson, R. M., & Meara, N. M. (1981). Father identification, achievement, and occupational behavior of rural youth: 10-year follow-up. Journal of Vocational Behavior, 19(2), 212-226.
- Jordan, A. E., & Meara, N. M. (1990). Ethics and the professional practice of psychologists: The role of virtues and principles. Professional psychology, research and practice, 21(2), 107.
- Jordan, A. E., & Meara, N. M. (1991). The role of virtues and principles in moral collapse: A response to Miller.
- Meara, N. M. (1979). Comparison of the stylistic complexity of the language of counselor and client across three theoretical orientations. Journal of Counseling Psychology, 26(3), 181-88.
- Meara, N. M. (1981). Semantic communication and expectations for counseling across three theoretical orientations. Journal of Counseling Psychology, 28(2), 110-18.
- Meara, N. M. (2001). Just and virtuous leaders and organizations. Journal of vocational behavior, 58(2), 227-234.
- Meara, N. M., Davis, K. L., & Robinson, B. S. (1997). The working lives of women from lower socioeconomic backgrounds: Assessing prospects, enabling success. Journal of Career Assessment, 5(2), 115-135.
- Meara, N. M., & Harmon, L. W. (1989). Accomplishments and disappointments of the Division 17 Committee on Women, 1970-1987. The Counseling Psychologist, 17(2), 314-331.
- Meara, N. M., & Patton, M. J. (1984). Language Analysis and Policies of Psychological Treatment: An Overview.
- Meara, N. M., Pepinsky, H. B., Shannon, J. W., & Murray, W. A. (1981). A comparison of semantic communication in and expectations for counseling across three theoretical orientations. Journal of Counseling Psychology, 21, 110-118.
- Meara, N. M., Schmidt, L. D., & Day, J. D. (1996). Principles and Virtues A Foundation for Ethical Decisions, Policies, and Character. The Counseling Psychologist, 24(1), 4-77.
- Meara, N. M., Shannon, J. W., & Pepinsky, H. B. (1979). Comparison of stylistic complexity of the language of counselor and client across three theoretical orientations. Journal of Counseling Psychology, 26,181-189.
- Patton, M. J., & Meara, N. M. (1983). The analysis of natural language in psychological treatment. In R. J. Russell (Ed.), Spoken Interaction in psychotherapy. New York: Irvington.
- Phelps, R. E., Meara, N. M., Davis, K. L., & Patton, M. J. (1991). Blacks' and Whites' perceptions of verbal aggression. Journal of Counseling & Development, 69(4), 345-350.
- Punzo, V. A., & Meara, N. M. (1993). The virtues of a psychology of personal morality. Journal of Theoretical and Philosophical Psychology, 13(1), 25.
- Robinson, B. S., Davis, K. L., & Meara, N. M. (2003). Motivational attributes of occupational possible selves for low-income rural women. Journal of Counseling Psychology, 50(2), 156-164.
- Rush, J. E., Pepinsky, H. B., Meara, N. M., Landry, B. C., Strong, S. M., Valley, J. A., & Young, C. E. (1974). A Computer-Assisted Language Analysis System (OSU-CISRCTR-73-9). Columbus: Ohio State University, Computer and Information Science Research Center.
- Schmidt, L. D., & Meara, N. M. (1984). Ethical, professional, and legal issues in counseling psychology. Handbook of counseling psychology, 56-96.
