= House of Deputies =

The House of Deputies is one of the legislative houses of the bicameral General Convention of the Episcopal Church in the United States of America. The other is the House of Bishops.

== Membership ==
Each diocese of the Episcopal Church, as well as the Navajoland Area Mission and the Convocation of Episcopal Churches in Europe, are entitled to representation in the House of Deputies by four clergy deputies, either presbyters or deacons, canonically resident in the diocese and four lay deputies who are confirmed communicants in good standing.

Each diocese chooses the manner in which deputies are chosen. They are generally elected by diocesan conventions. If a special meeting of the General Convention occurs, the deputies elected to the preceding General Convention continue to serve as deputies. If a vacancy occurs in a diocesan delegation, the diocese determines how a new deputy is chosen.

== Officers ==
=== President and vice president ===
The House of Deputies elects a president from among its members as its presiding officer. The president can be of either order. Presidents are elected every three years, taking office at the adjournment of the General Convention at which they were elected and continuing until the adjournment of the following General Convention. Individuals can be elected for up to three consecutive terms. The president appoints an advisory council and a chancellor educated in secular and ecclesiastical law for advice and consultation. A vice president, who must be from a different order than the president, is also elected. In cases of resignation, death, or inability of the president, the vice president performs the duties of the office until a new president is elected.

The president since 2022 is Julia Ayala Harris of the Diocese of Oklahoma. She is the first Latina woman to hold the position. The first laywoman to be elected House of Deputies president was Pamela P. Chinnis of the Diocese of Washington (D.C.) (1991–2000). The first layman to be elected to the office of President of the House of Deputies was former Supreme Court Justice Owen Roberts who served in that capacity in 1946.

The vice president of the House of Deputies is The Rev. Steve Pankey of the Diocese of Kentucky, elected in 2024.

==== List of presidents ====
- Julia Ayala Harris (elected 2022)
- Gay Clark Jennings (2012-2022)
- Bonnie Anderson (2006–2012)
- George Werner (2000–2006)
- Pamela Pauly Chinnis (1991–2000)
- David Collins (1985–1991)
- Charles Radford Lawrence (1976–1985)
- John Coburn (1967–1976)
- Clifford P. Morehouse (1961–1967)
- Theodore Wedel (1952–1961)
- Claude Willard Sprouse (1949–1952)
- Owen Roberts (1946–1949)
- ZeBarney Thorne Phillips (1925–?)
- Alexander Mann (1913–1925)
- Randolph Harrison McKim (1907–1913)
- John Lindsay (1901–1907)
- Morgan Dix (1886–1898)
- Eben Beardsley (1880–1886)
- Alexander Burgess (1877–1880)
- James Craik (1862–1877)
- William Creighton (1859–1862)
- William Edward Wyatt (1829–1859)
- William Wilmer (1817–1829)
- Isaac Wilkins (1811–1817)
- Abraham Beach (1801–1811)
- David Griffith (June 22 – October 11, 1786)

==== List of vice-presidents ====
- Steve Pankey (elected 2024)
- Rachel Taber-Hamilton (2022-2024)
- Byron Rushing (2012-2022)
- vacant (2010–2012)
- Brian N. Prior (2006–2010)
- Bonnie Anderson (2003–2006)
- George Werner (1994–2000)
- Wallace A. Frey (1991–1992)
- Pamela Pauly Chinnis (1986–1991)
- Charles Radford Lawrence (1976)
- Charles V. Willie (1970–1976)

=== Secretary ===
The secretary of the House of Deputies is elected every three years by majority vote at the start of each General Convention. The secretary certifies deputies and keeps minutes and records of the house. In addition, the secretary also notifies the bishops and secretaries of every diocese to actions of General Convention, especially alterations to the Book of Common Prayer and the constitution of the Episcopal Church. If the offices of president and vice president become vacant during the triennium, the secretary performs the duties of president until the next meeting of General Convention. With the approval of the house, the secretary may appoint assistant secretaries.

At each regular meeting of General Convention, the secretary of the House of Deputies is by concurrent action of both houses made the secretary of the General Convention. In this capacity, the secretary oversees the publishing of the Journal of the General Convention. Gregory S. Straub was elected secretary of the House of Deputies and the General Convention in 2006.

== Procedure ==
In many cases, a simple majority vote of all deputies is sufficient for a motion to pass. However, the lay or clerical representation of any three dioceses may require a "vote by orders". In some cases, the constitution and canons require a vote by orders. In a vote by orders, the votes of the clerical and lay orders are counted separately. Each diocese has a single vote in each order and a majority of dioceses must vote in favor in each order for a motion to pass.
