= Wendee M. Wechsberg =

American social science researcher

- Born: Wendee Mara Wechsberg; May 21, 1954 (age 72); Miami, Florida
- Education: University of South Florida, Vanderbilt University, North Carolina State University
- Known for: NIH-funded HIV biobehavioral scientist & originator of the Women's CoOp and Health CoOp HIV prevention intervention series for women and couples.

Wendee M. Wechsberg (born May 21,1954) is an American biobehavioral social science researcher. She has utilized mixed methods research to develop and evaluate HIV prevention interventions for diverse populations, focusing on underserved women, adolescent girls, and couples who use substances since 1994. She has focused her career in the scientific field of addressing gender inequalities in relation to the syndemic factors of substance use, HIV, and gender violence. She is known for the creation of the evidence-based Women’s CoOp HIV prevention intervention for women who used crack-cocaine and subsequent age-, gender- and culturally-sensitive global adaptations across more than three decades of HIV research.

== Early life and education ==
Wechsberg was born in Miami, Florida on May 21,1954 to Drs. Florence and Henry Wechsberg. In 1975, Wechsberg received a Bachelor of Arts degree in Anthropology from the University of South Florida and earned her Master of Science degree in Human Developmental Counseling from Peabody College at Vanderbilt University in 1979. She was awarded a PhD in Community Psychology from North Carolina State University in 1993.

== Career history ==
Dr. Wechsberg started her earlier career in 1977 as a substance use treatment director in Raleigh, North Carolina.

Since 1999, she has served as the Principal Researcher and Director of the Substance Use, Gender, and Applied Research (SUGAR) Program at RTI International. Wechsberg has held adjunct professor positions in Health, Policy and Administration at the University of North Carolina at Chapel Hill (UNC) Gillings School of Global Public Health, Psychology in the Public Interest at North Carolina State University (NCSU), and Psychiatry and Behavioral Sciences at the Duke University School of Medicine.

She has been affiliated with the National Association for Addiction Professionals, Addiction Professionals of North Carolina, American Association of Community Psychology, American Psychological Association, American Public Health Association, College on Problems of Drug Dependence, and the International AIDS Society.

Wechsberg has authored over 185 peer-reviewed publications on HIV, substance use, and gender, and has delivered more than 100 conference presentations. Wechsberg’s career has been supported by 15 National Institutes of Health (NIH). She is the creator of the Women's CoOp, an HIV prevention program tailored for women who use substances, conceived in 1998, with subsequent global adaptations including the Women’s Health CoOp, the Young Women's CoOp, and Couples Health CoOp series focused on changing the gender norms.

== Honors ==
Based on her long history of funded research from the National Institutes on Drug Abuse, Wechsberg was ranked third among those researchers who received HIV/AIDS investigator-initiated grants. Dr. Wechsberg was selected to the 2022 Forbes Women 50 over 50 Impact list. Selected in 2023 and 2024 for North Carolina’s Top Women Leaders in Women We Most Admire. Wechsberg has been honored with several company-sponsored awards throughout her career at RTI.
