= USS De Soto (1859) =

U.S. gunboat

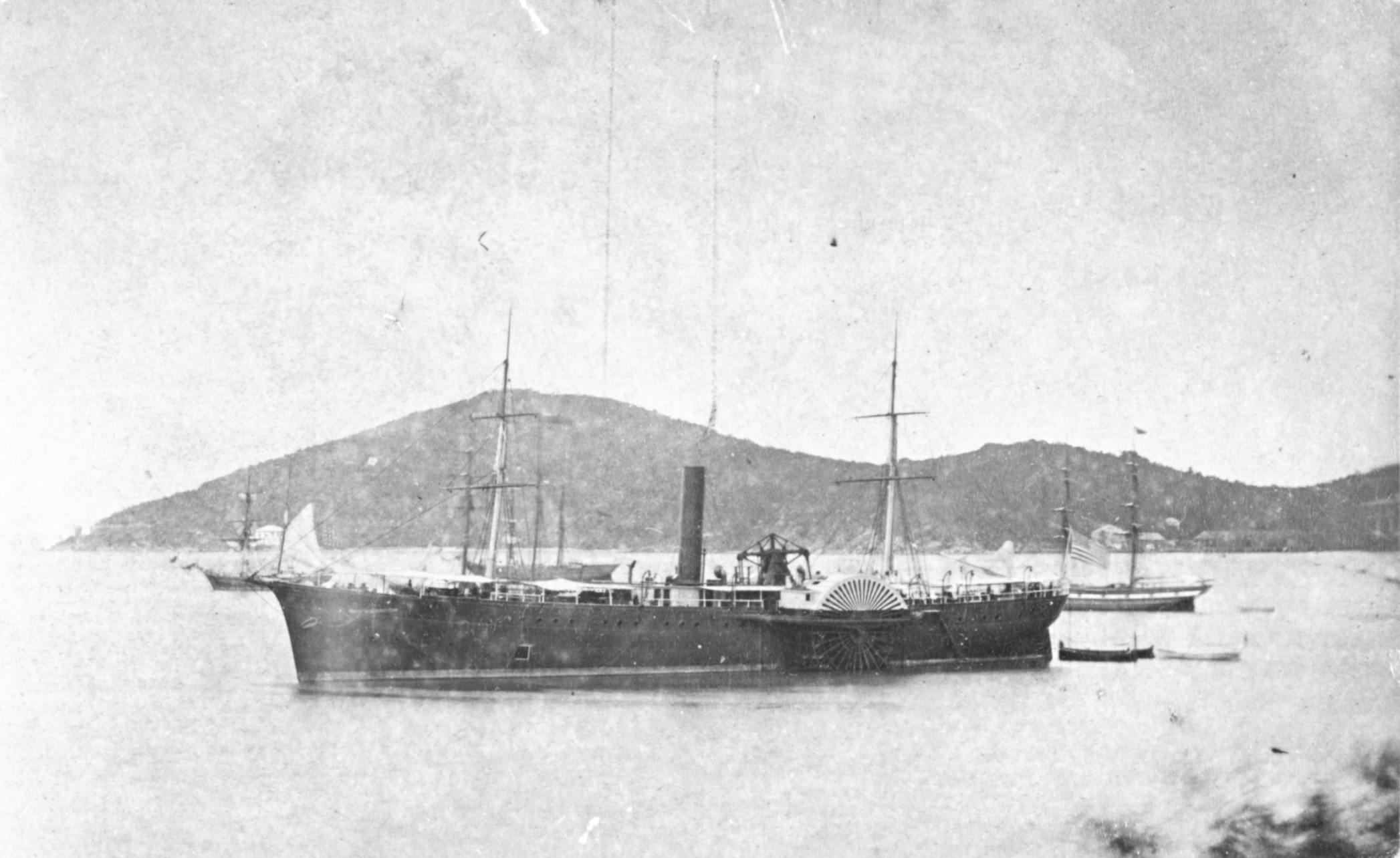
- USS De Soto in the harbor of Ponce, Puerto Rico, in 1868. The original print is mounted on a carte de visite.

History

United States
- Name: SS De Soto
- Namesake: Hernando De Soto (1496-1524), Spanish explorer and conquistador
- Owner: Livingston, Crocheron & Co.
- Port of registry: United States
- Route: New York–Havana–New Orleans
- Builder: Lawrence & Foulks (New York City)
- Launched: 25 June 1859
- Completed: 1859
- In service: August 1859?
- Out of service: 12 August 1861
- Fate: Sold to U.S. Navy, 12 August 1861

United States
- Name: USS De Soto
- Acquired: Purchased 21 August 1861
- Commissioned: 1861 – 16 Jun 1864; 12 Aug 1865 – 11 Sep 1868
- Fate: Sold 30 September 1868

United States
- Name: SS De Soto
- Owner: Livingston, Fox & Co.
- Port of registry: United States
- Route: New York–Havana–New Orleans
- Acquired: Purchased from U.S. Navy 30 September 1868
- In service: 1868
- Out of service: 31 December 1870
- Fate: Destroyed by fire 31 December 1870

General characteristics
- Displacement: 1,675 tons
- Length: 253 ft (77 m)
- Beam: 38 ft (12 m)
- Draught: 16 ft (4.9 m)
- Propulsion: 1 × vertical beam (65 in × 11 ft); 2 × 30-ft diameter sidewheels; auxiliary sails
- Speed: 14 mph (12 knots) in favorable conditions
- Complement: 130
- Armament: 1861: 8 × 32-pdr guns; 1 × 30-pdr Parrott rifle; 1863: 1 × 11-inch Dahlgren; 1 × 30-pdr Parrot rifle; 6 × 32-pdr rifles; 2 × 12-pdr smoothbores

USS De Soto was a fast wooden-hulled sidewheel steamship that saw service as a U.S. Navy gunboat during the American Civil War.

De Soto was originally a privately owned vessel, built for passenger service between New York and New Orleans. With the outbreak of the Civil War in 1861, she was purchased by the Navy, commissioned as USS De Soto, and sent to assist with the blockade of Confederate ports. De Soto's speed made her an effective pursuit ship, and she would capture or bring about the destruction of a total of eighteen blockade runners during the war.

In the postwar period, De Soto continued to serve with the Navy, mostly in South American waters, until resold to her original owners in 1868 for resumption of service as a passenger ship. She caught fire and was burned to the waterline in December 1870.

== Construction and design ==
De Soto was built by Lawrence & Foulks of Brooklyn, New York in 1859 for Livingston, Crocheron & Co., which ran a line of passenger steamships between New York and New Orleans. At 1,675 tons and 253 feet (77 m) in length, De Soto was quite a large steamer for her time, and considered a fine example of her type. She was named after Hernando De Soto, a Spanish explorer and conquistador.

De Soto was powered by a 65-inch (170 cm) bore, 11-foot (3.4 m) stroke single-cylinder vertical beam engine, built by the Morgan Iron Works of New York. The engine, which drove a pair of 30-foot sidewheels, was capable of delivering up to 14 mph (12 knots)—a good speed for the time, which would soon make De Soto a favorite with the travelling public and which would later prove invaluable for pursuing blockade runners during the Civil War. The ship had a single, raked smokestack forward of the engine, and two masts, one fore and one aft—the fore mast square rigged—to provide auxiliary sail power.

== Commercial service, 1859–61 ==
De Soto appears to have entered service in August 1859, carrying mail, passengers and specie between New York and New Orleans, with an intermediate stop at Havana, Cuba. She would maintain a regular service on this route, making a round trip about once a month, until shortly after the outbreak of the Civil War in April 1861.

The ship made a fast passage of less than four days from Havana to New York in April 1860, at an average speed of around 14 mph. By this time she had already earned a reputation as a "fast and popular steamship". Another fast run, again at an average speed of about 14 mph, was made in June following.

In addition to her passengers and cargo, De Soto also acted as a conduit for news between Cuba and the United States. Most of the news conveyed by De Soto was of a mundane character—for example, reports of activity on the Havana sugar market—but sometimes it was of more interest. In October 1860 for instance, De Soto reported the interception at Sierra Morena, Cuba of an illegal slave ship carrying 800 African slaves. The captain and crew of the slave ship were detained by local authorities, but about 400 of the slaves had already been dispersed ashore and could not be retrieved.

De Soto became one of the last steamships to engage in trade between the North and the breakaway Southern states when she departed New York for New Orleans on 23 April 1861, eleven days after the outbreak of the Civil War. The Confederacy however missed the opportunity to seize the vessel, and she returned safely to New York. On 6 May, De Soto departed New York for Havana once again, but on this occasion it was "not considered prudent" for the ship to continue on to New Orleans.

De Soto made one further voyage to Havana in June. On 21 August 1861, she was purchased by the U.S. Navy for the sum of $161,250 for conversion into a gunboat.

== American Civil War, 1861–65 ==
=== Gulf Blockading Squadron ===
At the New York Navy Yard, De Soto was fitted out for naval service, including the installation of a battery consisting of one 30-pounder Parrott rifle and eight 32-pound guns. She was then commissioned as USS De Soto, with Commander William M. Walker placed in command.

The steamer put to sea on 19 November with ordnance stores for Fort Pickens, Florida, and vessels in the Gulf of Mexico, arriving off Southwest Pass, Mississippi River, after 11 December. Joining the Gulf Blockading Squadron at that time, De Soto patrolled for Confederate blockade runners near Barataria Bay. Given the sometimes light winds of the Gulf and inshore waters, the vessel's shallow draft and steam power gave De Soto an advantage over her mainly sail-powered prey. Cmdr. Walker's first month in the region began poorly, however, when his ship collided with the French war steamer Milan, then adrift off South West Pass, Mississippi River. Although damage to De Soto was slight, the Milan was disabled and thus needed a tow into the Union anchorage.

In spite of this initial mishap, De Soto's first capture did not take long, as she and a bluejacket-crewed lugger took schooner Major Barbour off Isles Dernières, Louisiana on 28 January 1862. Cmdr. Walker's crew discovered 8 barrels of gunpowder and 198 cases of gunpowder, nitrates, sulfur, and percussion caps in the blockade runner. On 8 February, the steamer caught the small schooner Star out of Bayou Lafourche, taking her four-man crew prisoner.

=== Western Blockading Squadron ===
Upon Rear Admiral David G. Farragut's arrival at Key West, Florida, in steam sloop-of-war Hartford in late February, the Gulf Blockading Squadron was split into parts, the Eastern and Western Gulf Blockading Squadrons. De Soto came under the command of the Western Blockading Squadron at that time, although she did not change her patrol station at Barataria, Louisiana. As the steamer continued blockade operations through the spring, De Soto also served as a mobile storeship, carrying extra bread and ordnance supplies. She remained there until early July, when she made a quick run up the Mississippi River, carrying letters and passengers to the warships participating in the siege of Vicksburg, Mississippi. Returning down river, De Soto sailed southeast along the coast of Texas, patrolling off Sabine Pass, the Brazos River and Brazos Santiago at the mouth of the Rio Grande.

=== Repair and refit ===
Three months of hot weather and lack of maintenance facilities took a toll on De Soto's boilers and she returned to New Orleans, Louisiana, for temporary repairs in early October. A backlog of work and lack of funds forced Rear Adm. David Farragut to send De Soto north, however, and the steamer arrived at the Philadelphia Navy Yard only on 18 November. Two months of repair work followed, during which time Cmdr. Walker was promoted to captain. At this time, De Soto's battery was also changed, to one 11-inch (280 mm) Dahlgren, one 30-pounder Parrot rifle, six 32-pound rifles and two 12-pound smoothbores.

De Soto stood down the Delaware River on 3 February 1863 and, after stops at Havana, Cuba and Santo Domingo, arrived back at Key West, Florida on the 15th.

=== Eastern Gulf Blockade ===
Assigned to the Eastern Gulf Blockading Squadron under Rear Admiral Theodorus Bailey, De Soto spent March and April fruitlessly cruising for CSS Alabama in the Gulf of Mexico. As one of the few fast steamers in Bailey's command, De Soto possessed a speed advantage over most of her blockade running prey. This was demonstrated on 24 April, when De Soto sailors boarded and seized two sloops, Jane Adelie and Bright, sixteen hours out of Mobile, Alabama, and each laden with cotton. Two schooners, General Prim and Rapid, were then taken the very next day, and they too carried cotton. All four prizes were sent to Key West for adjudication. On 27 April, De Soto continued the run of good luck, seizing the British schooner Clarita en route from Havana, Cuba to Matamoras.

Patrolling north and west of the Tortugas, the warship then captured the schooner Sea Bird on 14 May. Three days later, De Soto pursued the smoke of an unknown steamer and, after an 18-hour chase, forced her to stop in open water well south of Mobile Bay. Before De Soto's boats could board, however, the enemy steamer's crew set fires and abandoned ship, sinking what turned out to be Confederate steamer Cuba beneath the waves. De Soto continued her fast pace of operations the next day, capturing schooner Mississippian on 19 May before finally returning to Key West for repairs.

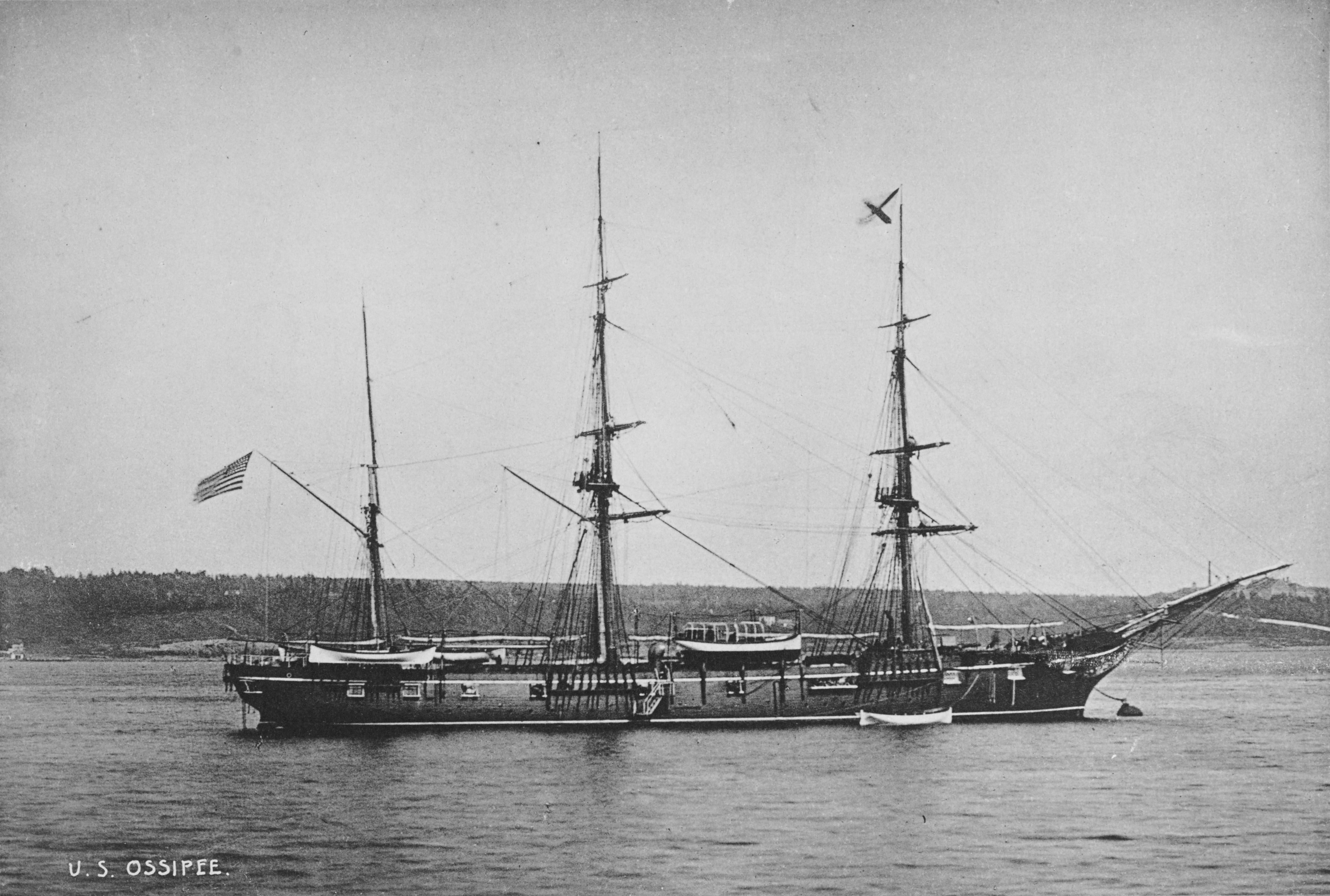
The screw steamer USS Ossipee. In June 1863, Ossipee lost a race with De Soto for the capture of a Confederate steamer.

Returning to sea in mid-June, De Soto's luck held and she captured schooner Lady Maria north of Tampa Bay on 6 July, laden with 104 bales of cotton. On the 18th, while cruising near Mobile Bay, De Soto spotted a steamer and closed and took the steamer James Battle, laden with rosin and cotton. At that point, two screw steamers from the West Gulf Blockading Squadron, Aroostook and Ossipee, closed with some disappointment, as they had been chasing the blockade runner. Later that same evening, as De Soto and Ossipee independently chased a second steamer, Capt. Walker closed and took William Bagley before the other Union ship could do so. Those actions by De Soto, which put Capt. Jonathan P. Gillis of the Ossipee in mind of "a voracious aquatic bird", led to a dispute over prize claims. The controversy was resolved later in the month when Rear Admiral Bailey and Rear Admiral David G. Farragut, commander of the Western Gulf Blockading Squadron, agreed to split prize shares.

De Soto continued her patrols in the Gulf of Mexico into the month of August, braving the sweltering heat to board and inspect coastal and seaborne traffic. The steamer Alice Vivian was seized on 16 August, as she had no papers, and the steamer Nita was taken the next day for the same reason. During this month, wear and tear on the steamer's boilers began to show and, despite attempts at repair, De Soto steadily lost speed. On 12 September, following a nine-hour chase under steam and sail, the Union ship finally took the blockade runner Montgomery, a chase Capt. Walker claimed should have taken one fourth the time if the boilers were in good order. Tinkering helped build up steam pressure to a point, and De Soto managed to chase down the screw steamer Leviathan on 22 September.

Returning to Key West in late October, De Soto received minor repairs and re-coaled. Captain Walker was relieved of command in early November by Captain Gustavus H. Scott, before spending the next six weeks patrolling off Northeast Providence Channel in the Bahamas. After coaling at Key West in early January 1864, De Soto patrolled off Mobile Bay, where she chased and captured steamer Cumberland on 5 February. The "Anglo-rebel" steamer had loaded arms, ammunition and 100 barrels of gunpowder at Havana in late 1863 and was trying to slip into Mobile when taken. De Soto proceeded to Havana in late February, for dry docking and repairs to her hull, before taking up a patrol station off the east coast of Florida in mid-March. A month later, she was back in Key West for coaling and repairs before returning to her familiar hunting grounds southeast of Mobile Bay.

=== Yellow fever outbreak ===
Sometime in April or May, De Soto's crew began coming down with yellow fever and the steamer was sent north in early June, arriving at Portsmouth, New Hampshire, on 16 June. As per normal practice, the warship was decommissioned that same day and the crew quarantined until the fever burned out. On 12 January 1865, De Soto was sent to Baltimore, Maryland for the installation of new boilers. She was still there when the war ended on 9 April 1865.

== Postwar naval service, 1865–68 ==
=== North Atlantic Squadron ===
De Soto was recommissioned at Baltimore on 12 August 1865, with Captain Walker placed back in command. The steamer stood out for Norfolk, Virginia, on 7 September and joined the newly organized North Atlantic Squadron, whose cruising ground covered the Atlantic Ocean south to the West Indies and the Gulf of Mexico.

=== Haiti rebellion ===
At this time, "revolutionists" in Haiti were fighting the government of President Geffrard from a base at Cap-Haïtien, and De Soto steamed to that port to safeguard Americans residing in that area. On 19 October, following a confrontation between the rebel steamer Valorogue and HMS Bulldog, revolutionaries in the port seized refugees out of the British Consulate, which was viewed as a "gross outrage against the British flag." On 23 October, despite Capt. Walker's attempts at mediation, HMS Bulldog attacked both the fort guarding the harbor and batteries in town. While so doing, the Royal Navy steamer ran hard aground inside the harbor. She continued to fire, however, and her cannon sank Valorogue and destroyed many buildings ashore. Being in cold iron, De Soto could not immediately move, but Capt. Walker did send his boats ashore to take off foreigners. A short while later, Captain Wake in HMS Bulldog asked for towing assistance, which Capt. Walker denied, though De Soto's boats did take off the sick and wounded. Following a boiler explosion, and unable to get off the reef, the British blew up their warship and withdrew from the harbor in their boats.

De Soto withdrew the next day as well, carrying the wounded British sailors to Jamaica before putting into Port-au-Prince, to debark the many foreign refugees picked up at Cape Haiten. After consultations with the American Consul, Capt. Walker took De Soto back to Cap-Haïtien on 7 November. There, he negotiated with a British squadron under Captain Macguire in HMS Galatea in the hopes of averting a retaliatory bombardment of the town, particularly as the Americans feared such an act would provoke widespread unrest and attacks on foreigners throughout Haiti. These talks failed and on 9 November, the British squadron bombarded the town in conjunction with an attack by President Geffrard's forces. With the defensive works destroyed and the town falling to government forces, the rebel leaders took refuge on De Soto. Capt. Walker then carried them to Monte Christo in the Dominican Republic. De Soto returned to Cape Haiten to keep an eye on events until 13 December when she sailed for home, arriving in Hampton Roads on 19 December.

=== Later South American service ===
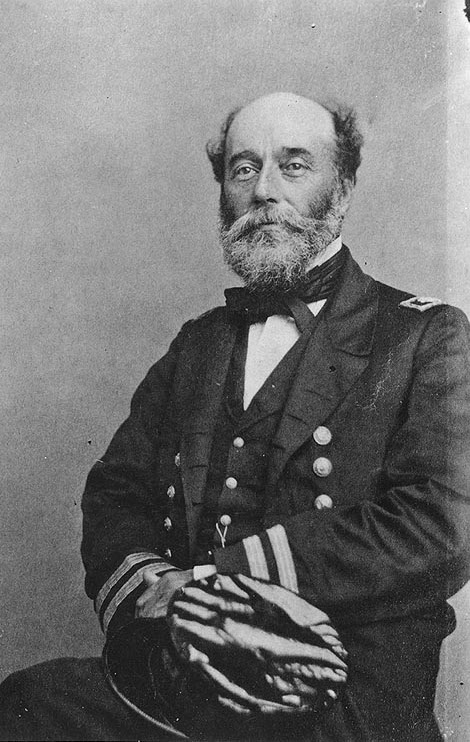
Captain (later Rear Admiral) Charles S. Boggs commanded De Soto from 1866 to 1868

Three days later, De Soto stood up the Chesapeake Bay and the Potomac River to the Washington Navy Yard, where she picked up letters for the West Indies. Steaming south on 1 January 1866, the warship stopped at Santo Domingo, Port-au-Prince and Havana before returning to Washington, D.C., on the 28th. She remained there until 19 March when she proceeded down river and into the Bay, reaching Hampton Roads on the 23d. On 10 April the warship was placed under the command of Captain Charles S. Boggs.

As the revolutionary disturbances in, and friction between, Haiti and the Dominican Republic continued apace, De Soto returned to the West Indies in June, arriving at Port-au-Prince on the 19th. The steamer also patrolled in the Gulf of Mexico, with an eye on the unsettled conditions in Mexico, where a guerrilla war raged against the French occupation of the country. De Soto remained in the region through the rest of the year before returning to Hampton Roads in the spring of 1867.

=== Earthquake and tsunami ===
Following a repair period at the Norfolk Navy Yard, De Soto conducted a cruise to New Orleans in May and June, putting in at the Philadelphia Navy Yard on 21 June. She stood down on the Delaware River five weeks later, this time sailing to Mexico. Off Vera Cruz, Mexico, on 17 September, the steamer watched the last of the French occupation end before sailing to Pensacola, Florida, for repairs in mid-October. De Soto proceeded south along the Florida coast on 22 October, stopping at Tampa Bay and Key West before arriving at St. Thomas, Virgin Islands, on 17 November. The ship, in company with sidewheel steamer Susquehanna and screw sloop-of-war Monongahela, was there as part of Secretary of State William H. Seward's plan to purchase the Danish West Indies. The day after De Soto's arrival, however, a magnitude 7.5 earthquake struck the region and a tsunami swept the steamer from her moorings and threw the ship onto a wharf. Luckily, the next wave lifted the ship and carried her back to deep water. With her bottom damaged and leaking badly, De Soto's sailors and carpenters spent the next ten days pumping water and repairing the hull. On 5 December, the steamer sailed north with the Danish Commissioner on board and the ship arrived at Norfolk, Virginia, on the 17th.

=== Final naval mission ===
After completing more substantial repairs over the winter, De Soto sailed to Venezuela on 3 March 1868, to secure the release of crewmen from the whaling schooner Hannah Grant, who had been captured on the peninsula of Paraguano. At Curaçao, Capt. Boggs learned that the crew had already been released, but he remained in Venezuelan waters in support of the American minister during interviews with the Venezuelan vice-president and other officials of the Republic.

De Soto steamed to Philadelphia, Pennsylvania on 28 August, and then proceeded to the New York Navy Yard in early September. There she was decommissioned on 11 September 1868.

== Return to commercial service, 1868–70 ==
On 30 September 1868, De Soto was resold to her original owners, now known as Livingston, Fox & Co. After a thorough reconditioning, she was returned to service as a commercial steamship, operating on her old route between New York and New Orleans with a port of call at Havana. She maintained a monthly service on this route for another two years.

On 25 December 1870, De Soto cleared New Orleans for New York but collided with a towboat and was forced to return to dock for repairs. On 31 December, she set out for New York again, with a cargo of 988 bales of cotton, 200 hogsheads of sugar, 1000 barrels of molasses and sundries. After travelling only 27 miles (43 km), a fire broke out onboard and the steamer was beached at McCalls Flat, where she burned to the waterline. The ship and cargo, with a combined value of $250,000, were deemed "almost a total loss".

== Bibliography ==
- Baughman, James P. (1968): Charles Morgan and the Development of Southern Transportation, Vanderbilt University Press
- Documents of the Assembly of the State of New York, 89th Session, 1866, Volume 4, Nos. 61 to 85 inclusive, p. 478, C. Wendell, Albany
- Heyl, Eric (1953): Early American Steamers, Volume 1, p. 129, Eric Heyl, Buffalo, New York
- Morrison, John Harrison (1903): History of American Steam Navigation, W. F. Sametz & Co., New York
