= USS Winooski (1863) =

Gunboat of the United States Navy

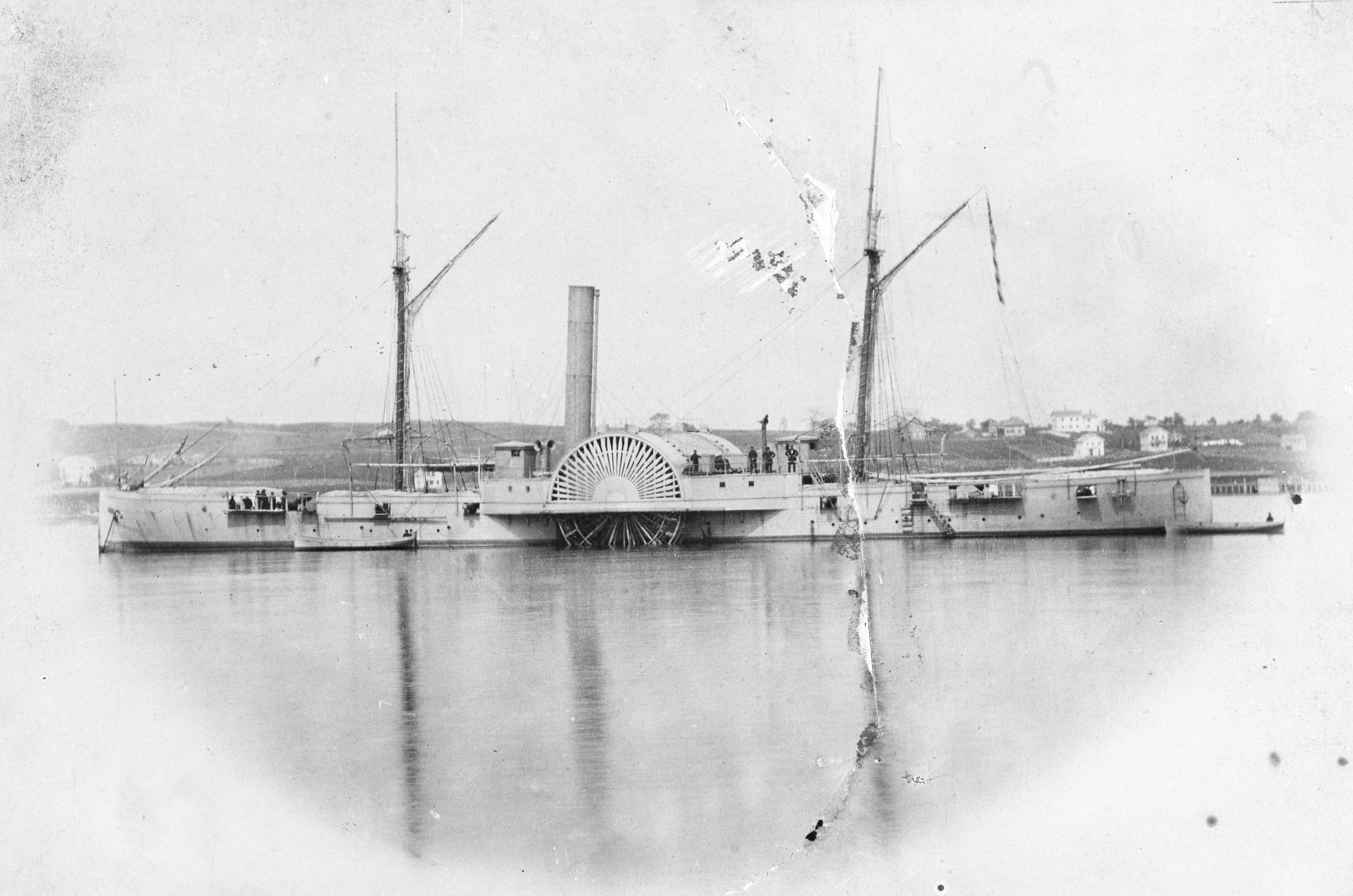
- USS Winooski, shortly after the American Civil War

History

United States
- Launched: 30 July 1863
- Commissioned: 27 June 1865
- Decommissioned: circa June 1867
- Fate: sold, 25 August 1868

General characteristics
- Class & type: Sassacus-class gunboat
- Displacement: 1,173 tons
- Length: 205 ft (62 m)
- Beam: 35 ft (11 m)
- Depth of hold: 11 ft 6 in (3.51 m)
- Propulsion: steam engine; side wheel-propelled
- Armament: 10 guns

USS Winooski was a large steamer with powerful guns acquired by the Navy at the end of the American Civil War. She was used by the Navy as a gunboat and served on the U.S. East Coast and the Caribbean Sea.

== Service history ==
Winooski, a double-ended, sidewheel gunboat, was launched on 30 July 1863 at the Boston Navy Yard; towed to Providence, Rhode Island, for the installation of her machinery; completed at the New York Navy Yard; and placed in commission on 27 June 1865, Comdr. George W. Cooper in command. For the rest of 1865, she conducted tests at New York City. Between April and August 1866, the warship cruised the fishing banks along the coast of Maine and in the Gulf of St. Lawrence.

She stood out of Portsmouth, New Hampshire, on the last day of August and set course for the West Indies. She patrolled the Caribbean until a yellow fever epidemic forced her to return to Portsmouth and quarantine late in June 1867. Laid up at the end of the period of quarantine, the ship remained at Portsmouth until 25 August 1868 when she was sold to Mr. John Mullen.
