= General Convention of the Episcopal Church in the United States of America =

Legislative body of US Episcopal Church

The General Convention is the primary governing and legislative body of the Episcopal Church in the United States of America. With the exception of the Bible, the Book of Common Prayer, and the Constitution and Canons, it is the ultimate authority in the Episcopal Church, being the bureaucratic facility through which the collegial function of the episcopate is exercised. General Convention comprises two houses: the House of Deputies and the House of Bishops. It meets regularly once every three years; however, the House of Bishops meets regularly in between sessions of General Convention. The Bishops have the right to call special meetings of General Convention.

All diocesan, coadjutor, suffragan, and assistant bishops of the Episcopal Church, whether active or retired, have seat and vote in the House of Bishops. Each diocese of the Episcopal Church, as well as the Navajoland Area Mission and the Convocation of Episcopal Churches in Europe, is entitled to representation in the House of Deputies by four clergy deputies, either presbyters or deacons, canonically resident in the diocese, and four lay deputies who are confirmed communicants in good standing. The Episcopal Church of Liberia is entitled to representation in the House of Deputies by two clergy deputies and two lay deputies, all with seat and voice but no vote. The Official Youth Presence is a group of eighteen high school youth, two from each province. They also have seat and voice but no vote. Resolutions must pass both houses in order to take effect.

The convention is divided into committees which consider resolutions. Resolutions arise from four different sources:

1. "A" resolutions from interim bodies whose work is collected in what is referred to as the "Blue Book"
2. "B" resolutions which come from Bishops
3. "C" resolutions which come from diocesan conventions and
4. "D" resolutions which originate from Deputies.

Each properly submitted resolution is referred to a convention committee which makes its recommendation to the House. When one house has acted on the resolution it is sent to the other house for consideration.

== Officers ==
=== Presiding Bishop ===
The presiding officer of the House of Bishops is the Presiding Bishop. Both houses take part in the selection of a new Presiding Bishop. The members of the Joint Nominating Committee for the Election of the Presiding Bishop are elected from both houses. The House of Deputies elects one clerical and one lay delegate from each province, and the House of Bishops elects one bishop from every province to sit on the joint committee. When a new Presiding Bishop is to be elected, the houses meet together in a joint session, and the nominating committee nominates at least three bishops. During the joint session, any deputy or bishop can nominate additional candidates. The House of Bishops elects the Presiding Bishop from among all nominees. The results of the election are reported to the House of Deputies, which then votes to confirm or not to confirm the election.

=== Other officers ===
The presiding officers of the House of Deputies are the president and vice president.

A treasurer is elected by the two houses at every regular meeting of General Convention. The treasurer formulates the budget of the Episcopal Church, receives and disburses all money collected under the authority of the convention, and with the approval of the Presiding Bishop invests surplus funds. If the office of treasurer becomes vacant, the Presiding Bishop and the President of the House of Deputies appoint a treasurer until a new election is held. The treasurer of the General Convention and the Executive Council is Kurt Barnes.

At each regular meeting of General Convention, the secretary of the House of Deputies is by concurrent action of both houses made the secretary of the General Convention. The secretary oversees the publishing of the Journal of the General Convention. In addition, the secretary also notifies the bishops and secretaries of every diocese to actions of General Convention, especially alterations to the Book of Common Prayer and the constitution of the Episcopal Church. If the offices of president and vice president become vacant during the triennium, the secretary performs the duties of president until the next meeting of General Convention. The Secretary is also the corporate secretary of the Domestic and Foreign Missionary Society, the corporate body of the Episcopal Church, and one of the four senior officers of the church. The Rev. Canon Michael Barlowe is the Secretary of the House of Deputies, having been appointed upon the retirement of his predecessor, the Rev. Gregory Straub in 2013.

Barlowe is also the Executive Officer of the General Convention, a position filled by joint appointment of the Presiding Bishop and the President of the House of Deputies. The Executive Officer "oversees all aspects of the work of Church governance, from site selection through supervision and funding of the work mandated by the convention". He supervises the secretary, treasurer, and manager of the General Convention and heads the executive office of the General Convention which coordinates the work of the committees, commissions, boards, and agencies (CCAB's).

== Interim bodies and standing commissions ==
Interim bodies, meeting in between sessions of General Convention, include the Executive Council, various standing commissions, and task forces constituted by the Convention which study and draft policy proposals for consideration and report back to General Convention. Task forces may vary in their size, membership, and duration depending on the General Convention resolution that orders their formation. The Executive Council, composed of the officers of the General Convention and members elected by the General Convention and provinces of the Church, oversees the execution of the programs and policies adopted by the General Convention. Each standing commission consists of five bishops, five priests or deacons, and ten laypersons. Priests, deacons, and lay persons are not required to be deputies. Bishops are appointed by the Presiding Bishop while the other clergy and laypersons are appointed by the president of the House of Deputies. Members are appointed to rotating terms so that the term for half of the members expires at the conclusion of each regular meeting of the General Convention. The standing commissions are:

- Liturgy and Music
- Structure, Governance, Constitution and Canons
- World Mission

The Presiding Bishop and the President of the House of Deputies are ex officio members of all commissions and can appoint personal representatives to attend commission meetings without the right to vote. They jointly appoint Executive Council members as liaison persons to provide communication between the council and each commission. These liaison persons are not commission members and cannot vote; though, they do have voice. The Presiding Bishop also appoints a staff member to assist each commission in its work.

Either house may refer matters to a commission, but one house cannot instruct a commission to take any action without the consent of the other house.

== History ==
The American Revolution was very disruptive to the Episcopal churches in the United States. There had been no Anglican dioceses or bishops in the Thirteen Colonies before the Revolution, thus when the American congregations were separated from the Church of England, "the chain which held them together [was] broken". In 1782, William White, the father of the Episcopal Church, wrote in his pamphlet The Case of the Episcopal Churches in the United States Considered, "it would seem, that their future continuance can be provided for only by voluntary associations for union and good government". In America, the central unit of the church would be the congregation, rather than the diocese. White, a disciple of John Locke, believed that the church, like the state, should be a democracy. He proposed that congregations in each state should unite to form an annual convention (as opposed to a "convocation" or "synod", terms which denote a body called together by a bishop) of clergy and lay representatives of the congregations. In White's plan, the state conventions would send representatives to three provincial conventions which would elect representatives to the General Convention every three years.

The constitution written in 1789 was very similar to White's plan, except that state conventions would elect representatives directly to the General Convention. Bishops would be democratically elected and responsible to the General Convention and their respective state (later diocesan) conventions. Bishops would be "servants of the Church and not its lords". It is often said that the Constitutions of the United States and the Episcopal Church were written by the same people. While this is not true, both were written around the same time in Philadelphia by people who knew each other and who sought to "replace hierarchical rule with egalitarian, democratic government".

The House of Deputies is the older of the two houses having been formed in 1785. William White was the first President of the House of Deputies. The House of Bishops was formed in 1789 to win the support of those who wanted a greater role for bishops. The House of Deputies had the advantage because with an 80 percent majority it could override a veto of the House of Bishops until 1808 when both houses were given absolute vetoes. White became the first Bishop of Pennsylvania and the first Presiding Bishop of the Episcopal Church.

== Notable Conventions ==
- 1785 Philadelphia—Initial General Convention of the Episcopal Church.
- 1817 New York City—Passed legislation founding General Theological Seminary.
- 1865 Philadelphia—After the close of the Civil War, bishops from two Confederate dioceses are warmly welcomed to General Convention, paving the way for the remaining Southern dioceses to rejoin the church soon afterward.
- 1895 Minneapolis—First General Convention west of the Mississippi River.
- 1976 Minneapolis—Approval of women for ordination.
- 2003 Minneapolis—Gene Robinson becomes the first openly gay bishop in the Anglican Communion.
- 2006 Columbus, Ohio—Election of Katharine Jefferts Schori as 26th Presiding Bishop, the first woman in the office. Response to Windsor Report: Dioceses are asked to exercise restraint in ordaining bishops who may cause further strain to the Anglican Communion.
- 2015 Salt Lake City—Election of Michael Bruce Curry as 27th Presiding Bishop, the first African-American in the office. Canonical and liturgical changes removing "language defining marriage as between a man and a woman", thus allowing same-sex marriage for all Episcopalians.
- 2018 Austin, Texas—After the Stoneman Douglas High School shooting, a plan to invest in firearms manufacturers and retailers as a form of shareholder advocacy was approved.

== See also ==
- List of General Conventions
