= St. James School, Maryland =

Episcopal school in Hagerstown, Maryland, US

Saint James School

Location
- 17641 College Road Hagerstown, MD 21740, U.S. 39°34′33″N 77°45′29″W

Information
- Type: Private Episcopal boarding school
- Motto: All good things and every perfect gift is from above. -James 1:17
- Religious affiliation: Episcopal Church
- Established: 1842; 184 years ago
- Headmaster: The Rev. Dr. D. Stuart Dunnan
- Grades: 8-12
- Enrollment: 235 total 75% boarding 25% day
- Colors: Maroon and White
- Website: www.stjames.edu

Saint James School is a private boarding and day school near Hagerstown, Maryland, United States. The school is a coeducational college preparatory school and one of the oldest Episcopal boarding schools in the United States. As a deliberately small school, Saint James enrolls roughly 235 boys and girls in grades 8-12, dubbed forms II-VI in the English school tradition.

Claggett Hall and Senior Circle

Saint James is accredited by the Middle States Association of Colleges and the Maryland State Department of Education. The school is a member of the National Association of Independent Schools, the National Association of Episcopal Schools, the Association of Independent Maryland Schools, Cum Laude Society, and the Mid-Atlantic Athletic Conference.

Fountain Rock estate, which would serve as the first Claggett Hall, College of St. James, 1842.

== History ==
Founded in 1842 as the College and Grammar School of St. James's, the school was conceived by William Augustus Muhlenberg (1796–1877), an Episcopal clergyman inspired by the Oxford Movement, who founded model schools on Long Island in 1828 and 1836. The founding headmaster of Saint James was John Barrett Kerfoot (1816–1881), who was Muhlenberg's principal disciple for thirteen years before Muhlenberg and the bishop of Maryland, William R. Whittingham, sent him to Western Maryland to establish a school. The models established at Flushing Institute and St. Paul's College, Long Island, and Saint James were the inspiration for other Episcopal prep schools; graduates and staff from Saint James founded St. Paul's School (by the Rev. Joseph H. Coit) in Concord, New Hampshire (1856); St. Mark's School in Southborough, Massachusetts (1865); and several other schools. Racine College in Wisconsin (1852) was modeled on Saint James, and its celebrated rector, James DeKoven, recruited faculty from Saint James.

In 1841, twenty acres and the house at General Samuel Ringold's Washington County estate, Fountain Rock, were purchased for $8,000. The estate's natural spring, the Bai Yuka, remains a focal point for the school community and namesake for the school's yearbook. The estate house was named Claggett Hall, in honor of the first bishop of Maryland, and served as the principal building. It would be destroyed by fire and rebuilt in the 1920s.

Kemp Hall fire, 1857

First Chapel Choir, 1919

First Mummers Society, 1948.

== Administration ==
Saint James is one of twenty-four Episcopal Schools in the Diocese of Maryland. The school is governed by a board of trustees. A Prefect Council, made up of ten seniors elected by the students and the faculty, upholds the traditions of Saint James and assists faculty members and the Headmaster in the school's day-to-day operations. Of this group, one member is elected Senior Prefect, who leads the Prefects.

Saint James's campus and the Blue Ridge Mountains.

== Campus ==
Saint James School is situated on roughly 800 acres of rolling farmland around the hamlet of St. James. The Georgian-style buildings are contained in roughly 100 acres (0.40 km^{2}), containing a natural spring, fields, and streams. The school lies 5 miles (8 km) southwest of Hagerstown and is approximately 70 miles (110 km) from both Baltimore and Washington, D.C.

- Claggett Hall: The largest boys' dorm on campus, Claggett houses over 60 fourth-, fifth-, and sixth-formers and several faculty members.
- Kemp Hall: The campus student center, rebuilt. Original building destroyed by fire in 1857.
- Powell Hall: The main academic building with over 20 classrooms.
- John E. Owens Library.
- Kerfoot Refectory.
- Laidlaw Infirmary.
- Cotton Building and the Bowman Fine Arts Center: The Fine Arts Center houses the auditorium, which seats about 300. This building includes music study rooms, the art studio/yearbook room, and a Choir room. The Mummer's Society puts on several plays every year, including a fall drama, a spring musical, senior-directed plays, and the Christmas Tradition of St. George and the Dragon.
- Alumni Hall: Alumni Hall houses two wrestling rooms, two dance studios, a weight room, locker rooms, and a fieldhouse. The field house contains three basketball courts, which can be converted into four tennis courts or two volleyball courts.
- The Chapel.
- Mattingly Hall: A dorm for third- and fourth-form boys. Hershey Hall was renovated in the spring of 2006 and renamed Mattingly Hall in honor of John M. Mattingly '58.
- Onderdonk Hall: A dorm for second- and third-form girls.
- Holloway House: The fourth-, fifth- and sixth-form girls' dorm.
- Coors Hall: A dorm for second-, third-, and fourth-form girls.
- Bai Yuka: The school's water source, the Bai Yuka is a natural spring that runs through campus; the name is Native American for "fountain rock".
- Biggs Rectory: The headmaster's house was completed in 2002.

== Spiritual Life ==
Chapel of Saint James

As an Episcopal school, Saint James introduces all of its students to the liturgical traditions of Anglican Christianity focusing on the values of humanity, integrity, and compassion.

The school gathers at the start of each day for a short chapel service, which includes a hymn, reading from scripture, and a short homily from the headmaster, chaplain, or faculty member. In the Anglo-Catholic tradition, a longer chapel service for High Mass is celebrated each Wednesday morning.

The Sacristans and Chapel Vestry assist in the liturgy of daily services. The Senior Sacristan is the second-ranking position for students on campus, following the Senior Prefect, and is the chief student assistant to the Chaplain, currently the Rev. Dr. Brandt Montgomery.

== Notable alumni ==
- Samuel S. Carroll Commander of the famed Gibraltar Brigade
- Grant Golden, basketball player, currently for the University of Richmond Spiders
- James L. Holloway III Former Chief of Naval Operations, Admiral USN, Ret.
- James M. Jasper Author, professor, and sociologist
- Foster MacKenzie III, Deceased Boogie/Rock/Blues Musician
- Alfred Thayer Mahan, 1856, naval strategist.
- Daniel Robinson Jr. (Robbie Basho), American steel-string guitarist
- Robert Jenkins Onderdonk 1870, Texas artist and father of Julian Onderdonk (1882–1922), the "father of Texas painting"
- Bertram Wyatt-Brown (1932–2012), Milbauer Professor of History, University of Florida; noted Americanist and author of Southern Honor.
- Justin Robinson, Professional basketball player for the Illawarra Hawks
- Joseph J. Himmel, Jesuit missionary and president of Georgetown University
- Thomas Richey, Anglo-Catholic priest and professor
- John Metchie III, American football wide receiver for the Philadelphia Eagles of the National Football League
