= Thomas Kelah Wharton =

English artist and architect (1814–1862)

Thomas K. Wharton
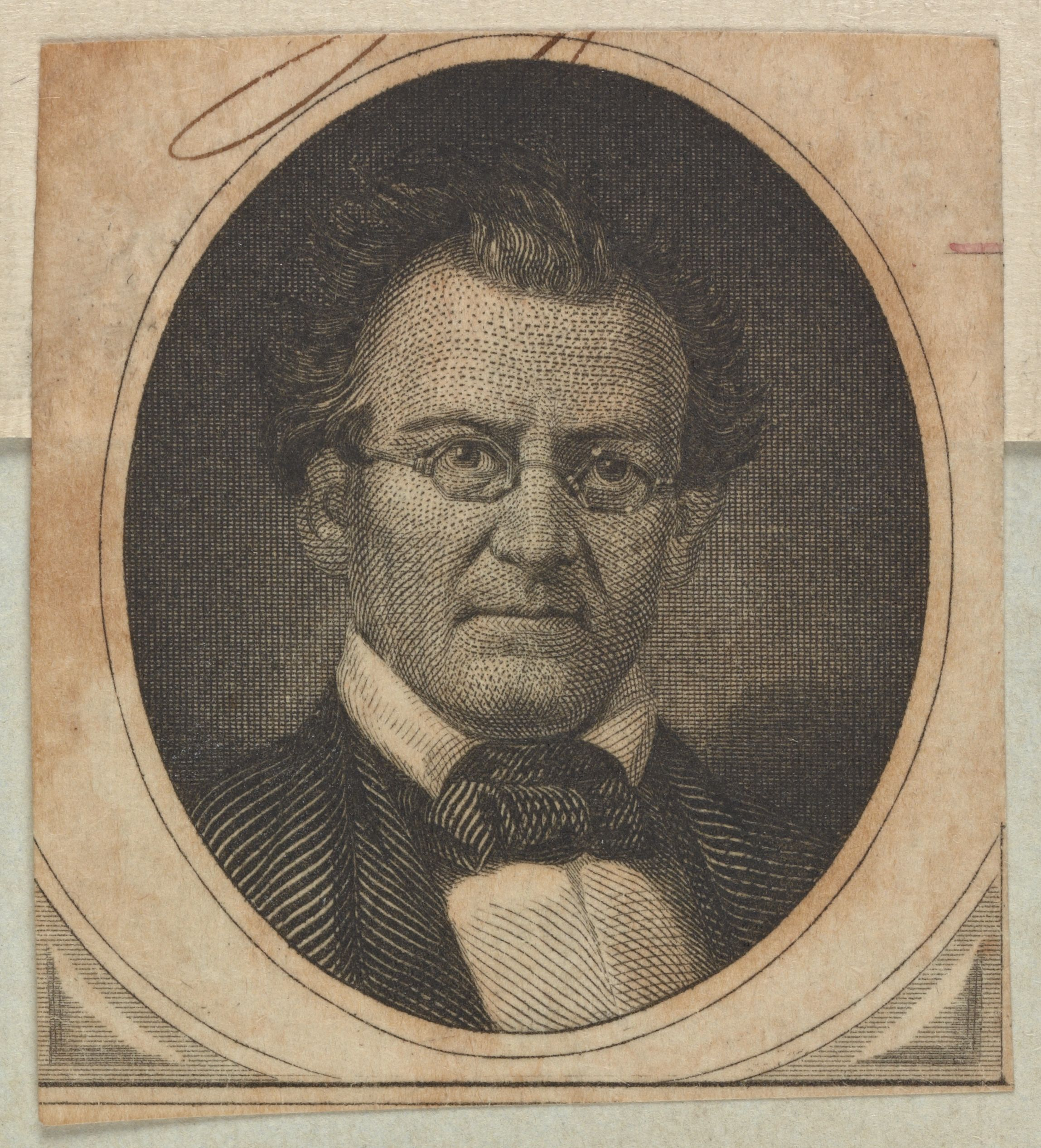
- Born: Thomas Kelah Wharton; April 17, 1814; Hull, England
- Died: May 24, 1862 (aged 48); New Orleans, Louisiana, U.S.
- Occupation: Architect
- Spouse: Emily (née Ladd) Wharton
- Projects: Christ Church Cathedral, New Orleans; Steel Chapel; New Orleans Customs House

Thomas Kelah Wharton (April 17, 1814 – May 24, 1862) was an English landscape painter, draftsman, lithographer, and drawing teacher.

== Early life and education ==
Thomas Kelah Wharton was born on April 17, 1814, in Hull, England.

His father, a general merchant and ship owner who encountered business setbacks, relocated to the United States in 1829. He purchased a 180-acre farm near the southern border of Piqua, Ohio, then arranged for his family to join him. Thomas K. Wharton, along with his mother and six siblings, reached New York Harbor on June 3, 1830, ready to join their father, who had started farming in Ohio.

Among his many interests, Wharton stood out as a prolific diarist. His writings span May 1832 to October 1834 and from June 25 to December 6, 1853. He was also a skilled pen and ink artist. He sketched everywhere he went, filling his journals with pencil, ink, sepia, watercolor, and oil drawings.

Thomas Kelah Wharton traveled to Columbus, Ohio in March 1832 and stayed for roughly a month. Among the sketches Wharton made during his travels across America, just two were of Columbus. Of the two sketches, one offers the earliest known view of Columbus, later reproduced on a Staffordshire Liberty Blue turkey platter.

Recognizing his strong artistic ability, Wharton's parents arranged for him to continue his education as a draftsman in New York.

== Career ==
In May 1832, he left Ohio for New York City to apprentice under noted architect Martin E. Thompson. His early success in New York gave him access to cultural circles and influential friendships. His diary remains a key source for understanding life in New York during the 1830s. That summer, his diary notes he escaped a cholera epidemic by steamboat to Dr. David Hosack's estate in Hyde Park, now the Vanderbilt Estate. During his three-week stay at Hyde Park, he made several engravings of the Hosak estate.

While at the estate, Wharton met Sylvanus Thayer of West Point and Gouverneur Kemble of the West Point Foundry in Cold Spring, New York. Thayer cautioned him about the cholera in New York and invited him to stay at West Point. Wharton stayed at the base under Sylvanus Thayer, who personally taught him geometry for four months. During the fall of 1832, captivated by the Hudson Highlands, he explored in search of views to sketch. Superintendent Thayer joined him on river outings and had cadets assist by carrying his drawing board and clearing brush.

By age 18, just two years after arriving from England, Wharton created building plans for the Chapel of Our Lady in Cold Spring, New York. It was a chapel overlooking the Hudson River, based on Gouverneur Kemble's idea for a chapel for his Catholic workers.

Wharton met Rev. Dr. William Augustus Muhlenberg through Col. Sylvanus Thayer, who employed him as a drawing instructor for the Flushing Institute's 1833–34 term.

He joined Rev. Francis L. Hawks in 1840 to establish St. Thomas' Hall in Flushing, which shut down in 1843. Shortly after, Wharton partnered with Rev. Hawks to start a school in Holly Springs, Mississippi, in 1844.

After marrying the daughter of Judge Huling of Holly Springs in 1845, Wharton moved to New Orleans, Louisiana. Wharton, who had taught James Gallier Jr., was employed by James Gallier Sr. to produce perspective drawings, including for Gallier Hall. He worked as an architect, designing Christ Church in 1847 and Steel Chapel on Felicity Road in 1850. In 1853, he was appointed superintendent of construction for the New Orleans Customs House, and chronicled nine years of life amid the prosperity of the Antebellum South.

== Personal life ==
Wharton lost his first wife, Maria Huling, in 1848 and married again three years later. His second marriage was to Emily J. (née Ladd) Wharton in New Orleans.

== Legacy ==
The New York Public Library holds the journal of Thomas Kelah Wharton. The 1830–34 diary was acquired by the New York Public Library in 1919 from Mrs. Wharton, who had settled in New York after her husband's passing.

His pen-and-ink drawings of the David Hosack estate are part of the Metropolitan Museum of Art collection.

== Gallery ==
Works by Thomas Kelah Wharton

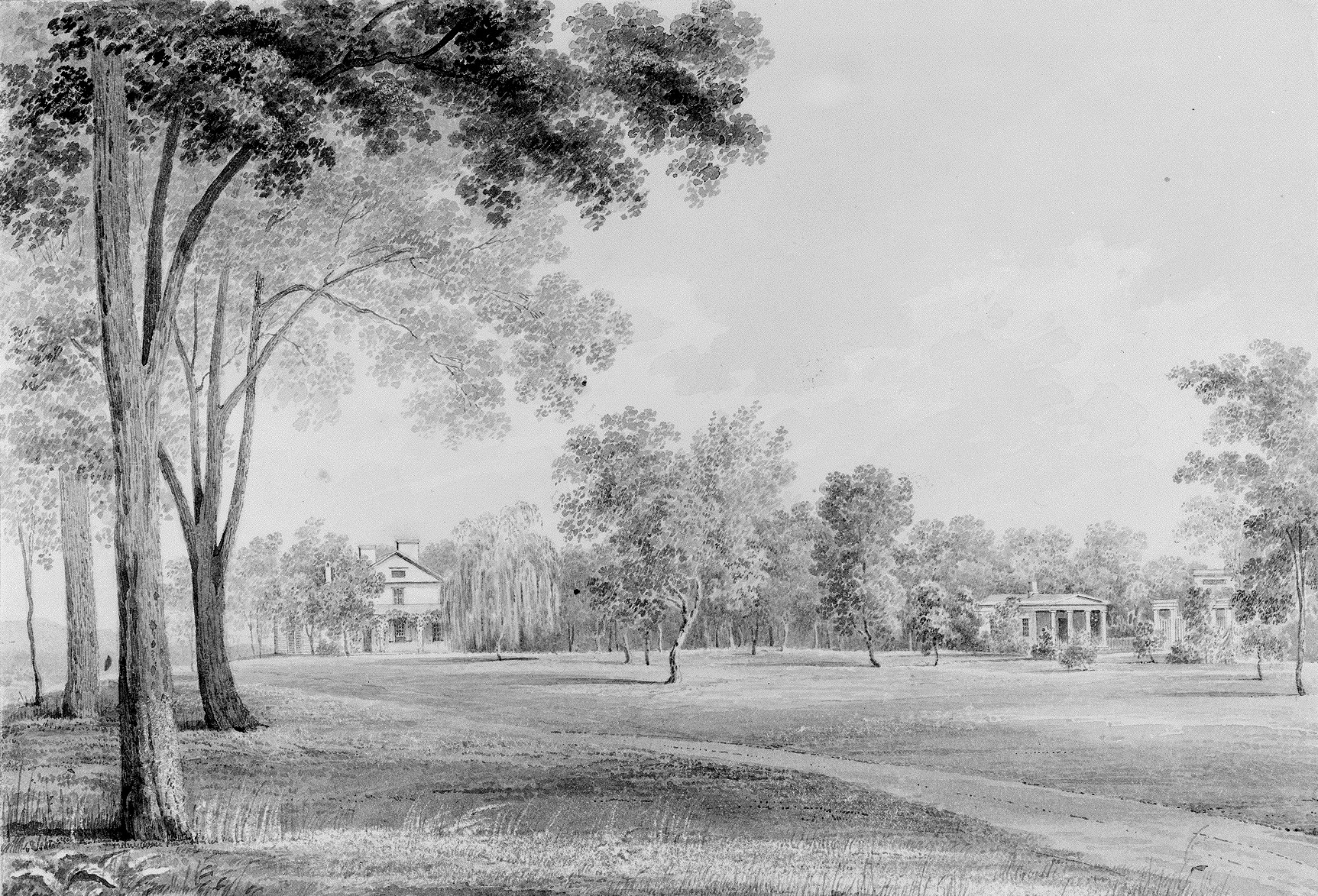
View of the David Hosack Estate, Hyde Park, New York, from the South, c. 1832

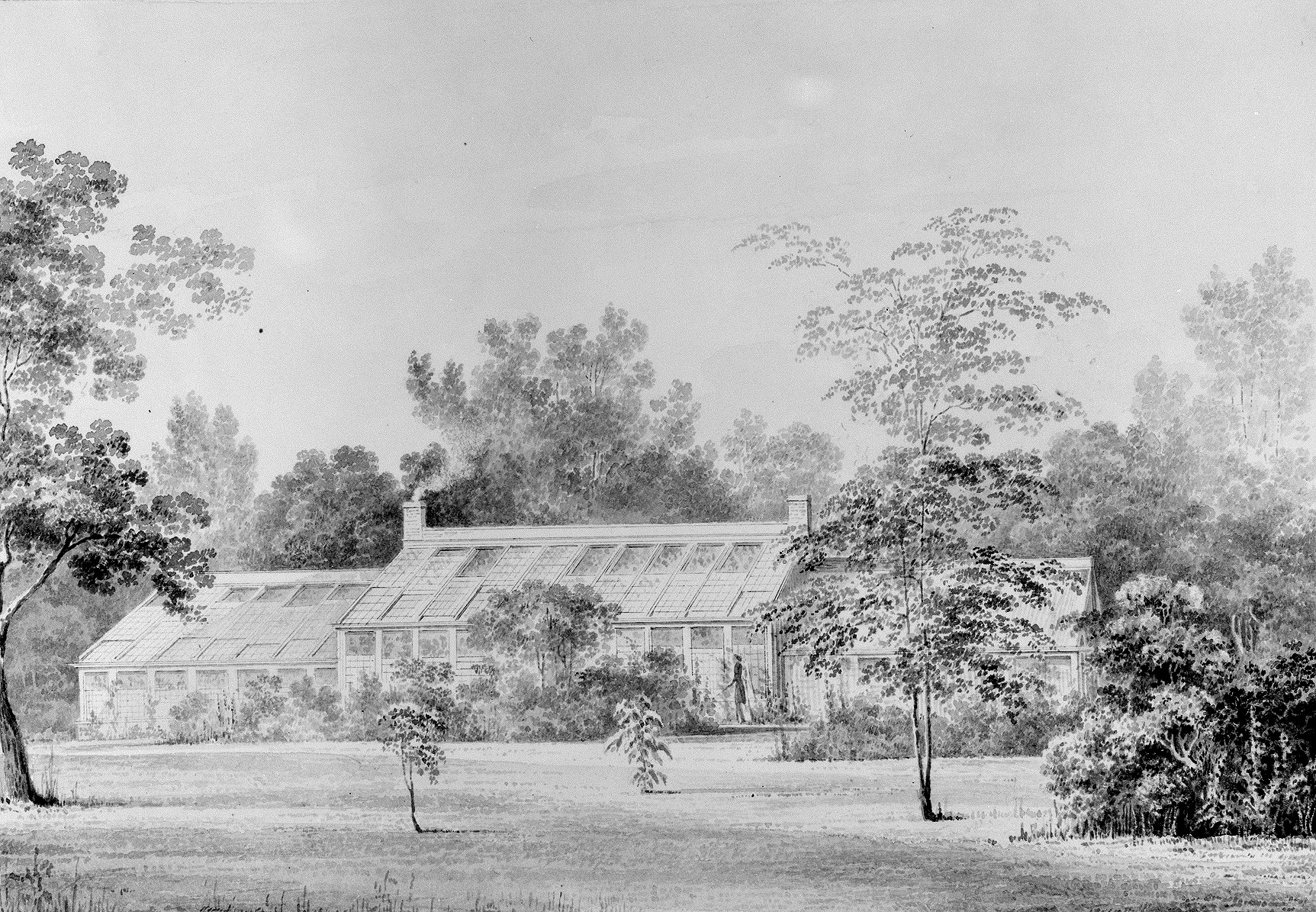
Greenhouse, David Hosack Estate, Hyde Park, New York, c. 1832

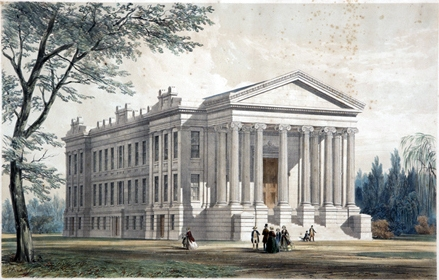
Municipal Hall, New Orleans, 1848

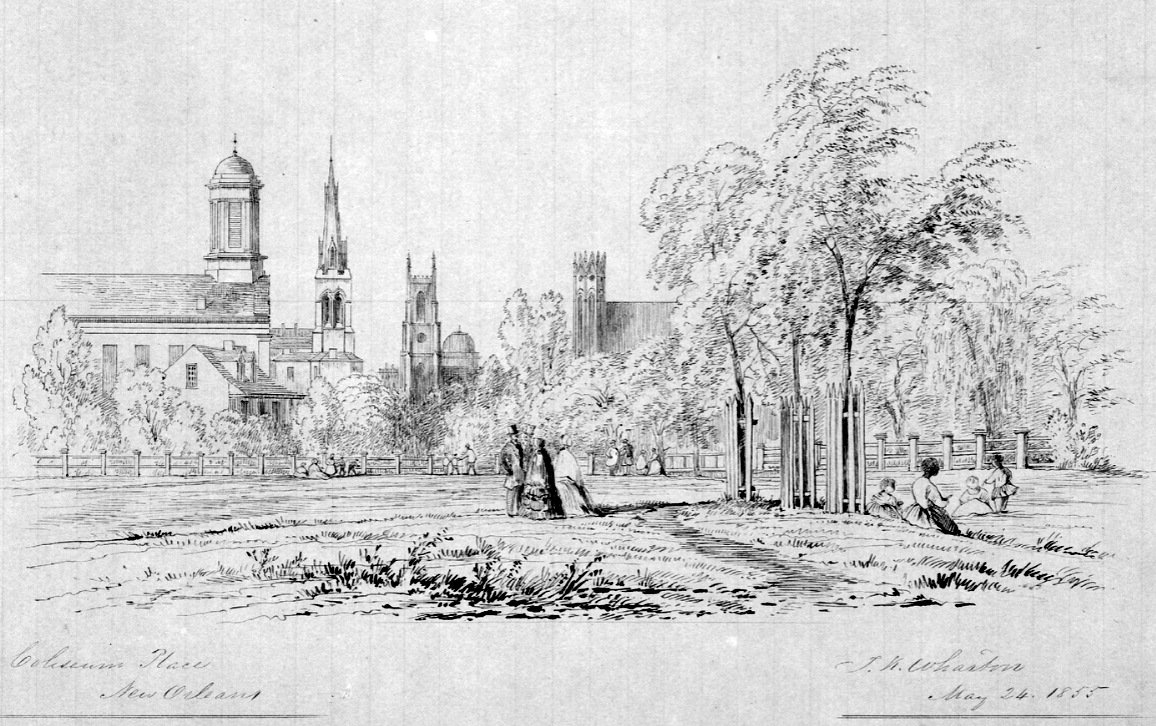
Coliseum Place, New Orleans, 1855

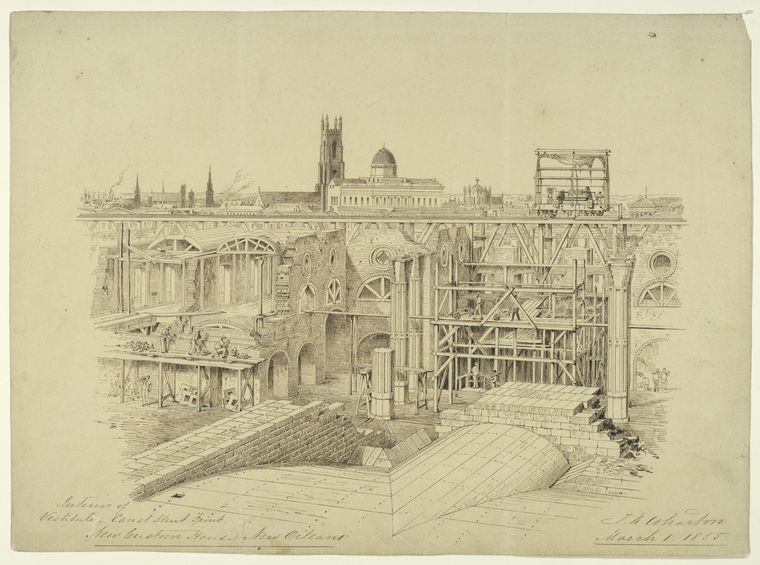
New Orleans Custom House Construction, 1855
