= St. Columba Mission =

Former Ojibwe community

St. Columba Mission was an Ojibwe community on Gull Lake in Crow Wing County, Minnesota, United States, about 11 miles (18 km) north of Fort Ripley. It centered on the first Native American Christian church in the United States west of the Mississippi River, founded in 1852 by the Episcopal missionary James Lloyd Breck and Enmegahbowh, who served as deacon. The squared log church was consecrated in 1853 by Bishop Jackson Kemper.

In November 1859, Bishop Henry Benjamin Whipple visited the mission. He wrote that with an interpreter they "held a sweet service in the log church of St. Columba on the banks of the loveliest of Minnesota lakes" and dedicated a cemetery.

The village that grew up around the mission included a school and a store. All of it was burned to the ground in the Dakota War of 1862, after which the mission moved to the White Earth Indian Reservation.

No visible trace of the settlement remains at the Gull Lake site, but it is listed on the National Register of Historic Places and a historic marker was placed nearby on Minnesota State Highway 371.
