= St. Ann's Hall =

Former girls' boarding school in Flushing, New York

- Flushing, Queens, New York; United States

Information
- School type: Private, Boarding school
- Established: 1837
- Founder: John Frederick Schroeder
- Principal: John Frederick Schroeder
- Gender: Girls

St. Ann's Hall was an American private all-girls boarding school located in Flushing, New York.

== History ==
St. Ann's Hall was an Episcopal boarding school for girls established in 1837 with John Frederick Schroeder as the principal of the female institute. St. Ann's Hall promoted female education rooted in Christian values, with Schroeder and his wife providing general supervision of the school community.

Located in Flushing, New York, St. Ann's Hall sat on six acres, seven miles from New York City. It occupied the 1828 Greek Revival building once home to the Flushing Institute founded by William Augustus Muhlenberg. The three-story Flushing building became the girls' seminary after Muhlenberg transferred his institute to College Point. After securing a seven-year lease on the Flushing Institute building at $940 per year, Schroeder renamed it St. Ann's Hall. St. Ann's Hall was one of several prominent Episcopal schools in Flushing, alongside St. Paul's College under W. A. Muhlenberg and St. Thomas' Hall led by Francis Lister Hawks.

The Rector led the Intellectual Department, offering English, French, and classical studies with resident governesses and New York lecturers. The Physical Department promoted health through varied exercises, a callisthenium, vegetable and flower gardens for botany and horticulture, a 900-foot hippodrome for equestrian training, and archery grounds, supervised by a governess. The Religious Department of St. Ann's Hall, led by the Presbyterian rector, held daily morning and evening prayer services in the chapel focused on spiritual growth. Drawing on models from Europe and the U.S., they adopted systems to advance every aspect of the household's education and health. Pupils stayed in furnished dormitory suites of two or three, with carpeted classrooms and wardrobe lessons from a matron. Meals were shared with staff in a spacious hall. Curatresses oversaw groups of six pupils to support studies and provide companionship.

The academic year was divided into two terms. The spring term started in mid-March and continued for twenty-one weeks before an August vacation, with vacation boarding available. Summer vacations ended on the day before the first Tuesday in October. Pupils were expected to bring a Bible, prayer book, bedding, towels, napkins, and utensils, or obtain them from the Hall's agent for a modest fee.

Schroeder oversaw the publication of eight volumes of the Circular of St. Ann's Hall in 1840.

== Closure ==
The remaining lease of St. Ann's Hall was transferred to Ezra Fairchild, who moved to Flushing in 1845 after managing a New Jersey boys' school dating back to 1816. Following the purchase of the property, the institution resumed its former name, the Flushing Institute.

Schroeder, who had led St. Ann's Hall in Flushing, moved to the City of New York in 1846 and became rector of the Church of the Crucifixion. St. Ann's Hall then operated in New York City for an extended period. In 1852, Schroeder moved to Brooklyn, New York to serve simultaneously as rector of St. Thomas Church. During this period, St. Ann's Hall functioned in Brooklyn under Schroeder's management.
