= St. Thomas' Hall =

Former boarding school in Flushing, New York

Location
- Flushing, Queens, New York; United States
- Coordinates: 40°45′28″N 73°49′37″W

Information
- School type: Private, Boarding school
- Established: 1839
- Founder: Francis L. Hawks
- Closed: 1843
- Principal: Francis L. Hawks (1839-1843); William M. Carmichael (1843)
- Gender: Boys
- Affiliations: St. Thomas Church; Protestant Episcopal Church

St. Thomas' Hall was an American all-boys private boarding school located in Flushing, New York.

== History ==
St. Thomas' Hall was an Episcopal boarding school for boys founded in August 1839 by the Rev. Francis Lister Hawks, rector of St. Thomas Church from 1831 to 1843.

Established in Flushing, New York, the school encompassed three acres of land. Buildings were erected and made attractive by their surroundings and appointments, at an expenditure of between fifty and sixty thousand dollars. Featuring a Gothic chapel and extensive facilities, it was regarded as the State's finest and most complete school at the time. During that period, Flushing was home to various literary institutions, including St. Paul's College under Rev. Dr. William Augustus Muhlenberg and St. Ann's Hall under Rev. John Frederick Schroeder.

The school could originally accommodate 120 pupils. It was designed to resemble a private residence to make students feel at home, rather than in a public institution. Its curriculum was divided into two departments—classical and commercial—intended to prepare pupils for their future pursuits. The school's chapel services and religious instruction reflected the doctrines of the Protestant Episcopal Church.

Reverend Dr. Francis L. Hawks served as the first headmaster of the school. Rev. Dr. Hawks, then pastor of St. Thomas Church, also operated a printing press, edited a newspaper, owned a stage line, and lectured in New York.

The Episcopal institution, headed by Rev. Hawks, employed fourteen instructors. Beginning in 1839, Rev. Ezra B. Kellog held the post of chaplain until 1843. Hawks was joined at St. Thomas' Hall by Thomas Kelah Wharton around 1840. Rev. Theodore Babcock served as an instructor between 1841 and 1843. Rev. William Barlow became an instructor at St. Thomas' Hall in 1842, following his resignation from St. Paul's Church in Flatbush. Succeeding Rev. F. L. Hawks in 1843, Rev. William M. Carmichael held the rectorship for a single academic year. Carmichael and his associate Gerardus Beekman Docharty held seminaries devoted to classical learning in Oyster Bay and Hempstead, Long Island.

In May 1840, new buildings were added to accommodate more pupils, including a chapel with a $1,000 organ. With high-end furnishings and hot-water heating, all of the school's income was consumed by expenses and the erection of the buildings. Enrollment rose to 140 by term's end, prompting more additions, against faculty advice, to support 200 students. An $11,000 loan was secured for Flushing, but debts mounted even as attendance reached 180.

== Closure ==
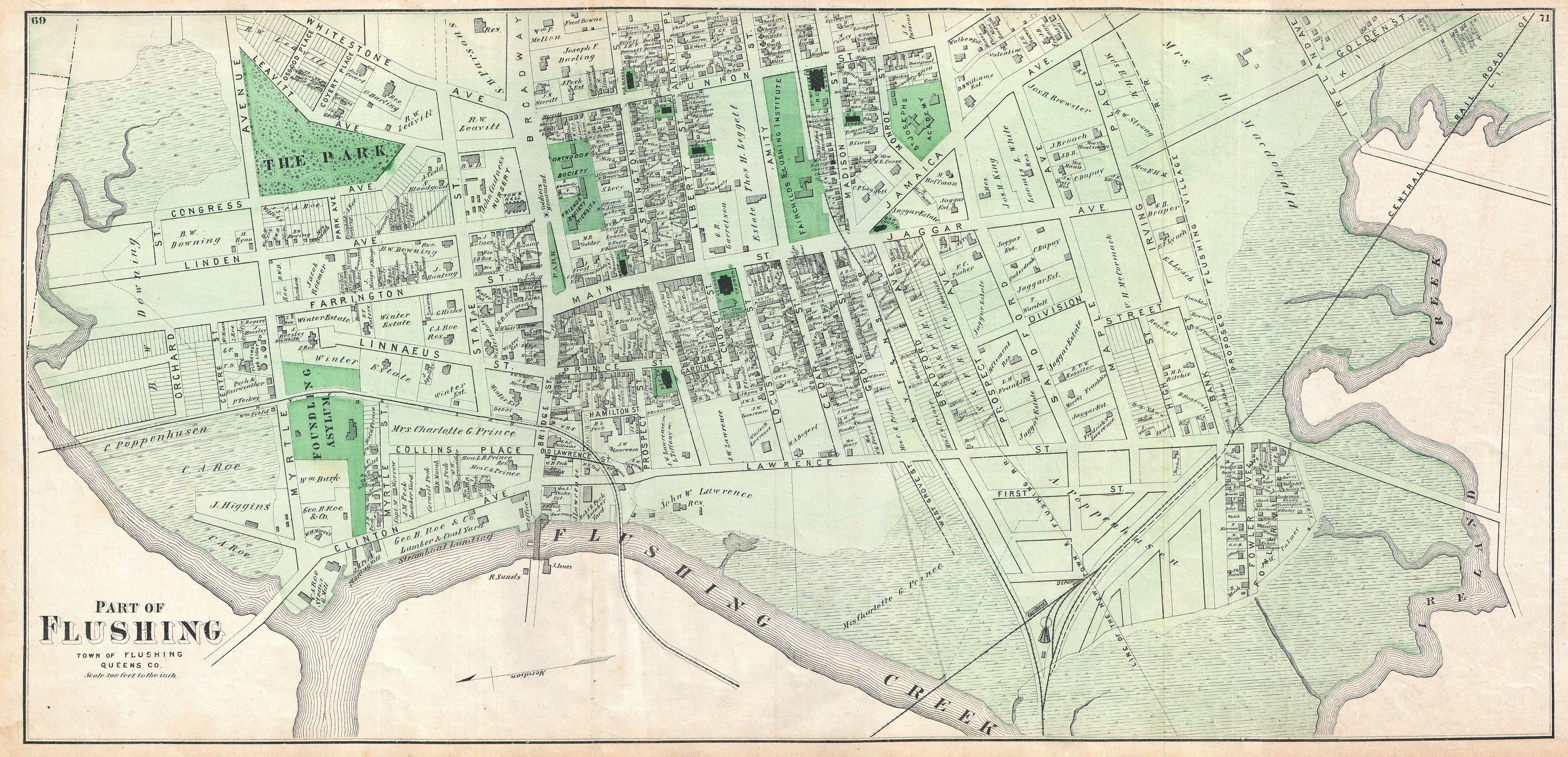
An 1873 map of Flushing, showing the location of St. Joseph's Academy

Hawks' costly improvements to the school resulted in financial distress and its eventual downfall. He was charged with extravagance and dishonesty. Dr. Hawks was left deeply in debt after suffering major losses when the school collapsed in the Panic of 1843. Without any prior notice to teachers or parents, the institution was unexpectedly closed in February 1843. Dr. Hawks announced the closure on-site, stating the children could remain in the hall overnight but must leave the next day. Hawks' debts in Flushing ranged from thirty to forty thousand dollars, mostly owed to working men and those of moderate means. His bankruptcy as Principal of St. Thomas' Hall prompted his 1843 resignation from St. Thomas Church and relocation to the State of Mississippi.

In 1844, Rev. Hawks partnered with T. K. Wharton to open a school in Holly Springs, Mississippi.

The site of St. Thomas' Hall soon came under William Henry Gilder, who secured a special New York State charter to open a female college. By 1848, the site was home to the Flushing Female Institute, a leading seminary, with William Henry Gilder serving as president from 1848 to 1859.

In 1860, Flushing pastor Father James O'Beirne acquired St. Thomas' Hall from Gilder for $13,000 and entrusted it to the Sisters of St. Joseph. The former St. Thomas' Hall was later transformed into St. Joseph's Academy for young ladies.

== Principal ==
- Francis L. Hawks

== Notable alumni ==
- James Gallier Jr.

== See also ==
- Flushing, New York
