= East Gull Lake, Minnesota =

City in Minnesota, United States

East Gull Lake
- City
- Location of East Gull Lake within Cass County, Minnesota
- Coordinates: 46°23′09″N 94°22′40″W
- Country: United States
- State: Minnesota
- County: Cass

Area
  - Total: 9.86 sq mi (25.55 km^{2})
  - Land: 7.88 sq mi (20.41 km^{2})
  - Water: 1.98 sq mi (5.13 km^{2})
- Elevation: 1,194 ft (364 m)

Population (2020)
  - Total: 986
  - Density: 125/sq mi (48.3/km^{2})
- Time zone: UTC-6 (CST)
  - Summer (DST): UTC-5 (CDT)
- ZIP code: 56401
- Area code: 218
- FIPS code: 27-17630
- GNIS feature ID: 2394600
- Website: eastgulllake.gov

East Gull Lake is a city in Cass County, Minnesota, United States. The population was 986 at the 2020 census. The nearest semi-urban area is that of Brainerd and Baxter. It is part of the Brainerd Micropolitan Statistical Area. East Gull Lake is in Central Minnesota's Brainerd Lakes Area and takes its name from the largest lake within its borders, Gull Lake.

East Gull Lake Airport (FAA code 9Y2) is a small two-runway airport.

== History ==
East Gull Lake was incorporated in 1947.

== Geography ==
According to the United States Census Bureau, the city has an area of 14.82 square miles (38.38 km^{2}), of which 7.86 square miles (20.36 km^{2}) is land and 6.96 square miles (18.03 km^{2}) is water. County Roads 18, 70, and 77 are the community's main routes.

== Tourism and recreation ==
Much of the activity in East Gull Lake is tourism, recreation, and vacationing. Residents of Minnesota and Iowa maintain summer homes in the area. Houses on Gull Lake's shores are the most prized and expensive, and have attracted residents such as Kristi Yamaguchi and her husband Bret Hedican. There are several high-end resorts in the city, including Cragun's Resort, Madden's Resort, Kavanaugh's Resort, and Gull Lake Resort. Several of the resorts have golf courses.

The population has greatly increased in recent years, and as of 2008 was more than 2,000 all year.

== Demographics ==
Historical population
Census	Pop.	Note	%±
1940	125		—
1950	238		90.4%
1960	311		30.7%
1970	440		41.5%
1980	586		33.2%
1990	687		17.2%
2000	978		42.4%
2010	1,004		2.7%
2020	986		−1.8%
U.S. Decennial Census; 2020 Census

=== 2010 census ===
As of the census of 2010, there were 1,004 people, 407 households, and 310 families living in the city. The population density was 127.7 inhabitants per square mile (49.3/km^{2}). There were 792 housing units at an average density of 100.8 per square mile (38.9/km^{2}). The racial makeup of the city was 98.6% White, 0.2% Native American, 0.5% Asian, 0.3% from other races, and 0.4% from two or more races. Hispanic or Latino people of any race were 1.8% of the population.

There were 407 households, of which 23.8% had children under the age of 18 living with them, 69.3% were married couples living together, 3.9% had a female householder with no husband present, 2.9% had a male householder with no wife present, and 23.8% were non-families. 18.9% of all households were made up of individuals, and 8.4% had someone living alone who was 65 years of age or older. The average household size was 2.46 and the average family size was 2.78.

The median age in the city was 47.7 years. 21.2% of residents were under the age of 18; 4.4% were between the ages of 18 and 24; 21% were from 25 to 44; 32.7% were from 45 to 64; and 21% were 65 years of age or older. The gender makeup of the city was 53.3% male and 46.7% female.

=== 2000 census ===
As of the census of 2000, there were 978 people, 370 households, and 294 families living in the city. The population density was 123.6 people per square meter (47.7/km^{2}). There were 709 housing units at an average density of 89.6 per square mile (34.6/km^{2}). The racial makeup of the city was 98.16% White, 0.31% African American, 0.10% Native American, 0.72% Asian, 0.20% from other races, and 0.51% from two or more races. Hispanic or Latino people of any race were 1.43% of the population.

There were 370 households, out of which 30.3% had children under the age of 18 living with them, 73.2% were married couples living together, 3.0% had a female householder with no husband present, and 20.3% were non-families. 17.6% of all households were made up of individuals, and 6.5% had someone living alone who was 65 years of age or older. The average household size was 2.64 and the average family size was 2.97.

In the city, the population was spread out, with 26.0% under the age of 18, 6.5% from 18 to 24, 26.5% from 25 to 44, 28.1% from 45 to 64, and 12.9% who were 65 years of age or older. The median age was 39 years. For every 100 females, there were 107.2 males. For every 100 females age 18 and over, there were 108.6 males.

The median income for a household in the city was $55,750, and the median income for a family was $62,813. Males had a median income of $40,809 versus $28,750 for females. The per capita income for the city was $27,329. About 6.6% of families and 8.7% of the population were below the poverty line, including 12.0% of those under age 18 and 8.3% of those age 65 or over.

== News ==
- The Northern Herald
- Brainerd Dispatch
