= Enmegahbowh =

Native American priest (c. 1820–1902)

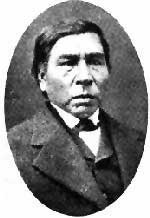
Enmegahbowh

Enmegahbowh (c. 1820 – June 12, 1902; from Enami'egaabaw, meaning "He that prays [for his people while] standing"; also known as John Johnson) was the first Native American to be ordained a priest in the Episcopal Church in the United States of America.

== Life and career ==
Born around 1820, Enmegahbowh (pronounced En-meh-GAH-boe), was the only child of the chief of an Ojibwe Band on Rice Lake near Peterborough, Canada. Because this group of Ojibwe "trade Indians" remained behind while the others pressed farther up the Great Lakes in search of furs, some consider Enmegahbowh an Ottawa. He was raised in a Christian Anishinaabe (Ojibwe) village near Petersburg which was affiliated with the Methodists. An Episcopal clergyman of the vicinity, Mr. Armour, persuaded Enmegahbowh's reluctant parents to send him to be educated with the clergyman's own sons. Enmegahbowh did learn to read and speak English, but after three months, the homesick boy ran away in the night and walked for two days to return to his own people. About 1831, Enmegahbowh's grandfather, a medicine man of high rank, inducted him into the tribal religious organization Midewiwin.

On July 4, 1841 Enmegahbowh married Biwabikogeshigequay (Biiwaabiko-giizhig-ikwe, "Iron Sky Woman", and baptized Charlotte), niece of Chief Hole-in-the-Day the elder. He met the Rev. Ezekiel Gilbert Gear, chaplain at Fort Snelling at the confluence of the Mississippi and Minnesota Rivers, and became an Episcopalian. Gear eventually introduced Enmegahbowh to the Rev. James Lloyd Breck, a missionary who had arrived in Minnesota in 1851, and who baptised Enmegahbowh.

Bishop Jackson Kemper ordained him deacon in 1859, and Enmegahbowh went to Crow Wing, Minnesota to assist in founding St. Columba Mission. Mille Lacs Chief Fine-Day was an early member of Enmegahbowh's church, and took over the mission in 1861.

== The Dakota War ==
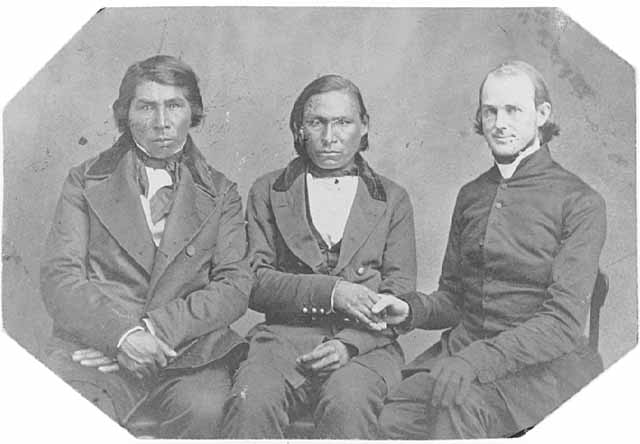
Enmegahbowh (left) with Rev. James Lloyd Breck (right) and Isaac Manitowab (center).

In 1851, the Dakota people signed into two treaties with the United States Federal Government, the Treaty of Traverse des Sioux and the Treaty of Mendota, which together ceded their claims to millions of acres and enabled white settlement in Central and Southern Minnesota. In exchange, the Sioux were to receive a reservation and annual payments totaling more than two million dollars, but ultimately received little other than a few trade goods. Most of the payments were actually made to white traders (supposedly for goods provided to the Sioux) or stolen through corruption within the Bureau of Indian Affairs. When Minnesota became a state in 1858, the tribes sent representatives to Washington, D.C. led by Chief Little Crow to complain about not receiving the benefits negotiated in the treaty, but had little success. The land on their reservation proved not arable, and new settlement practices restricted hunting.

During the Dakota War of 1862, which began as treaty payments were due for distribution to the starving Sioux at Fort Ridgely, the Gull Lake Band under Chief Hole in the Day the Younger of Mississippi Chippewa rose to attack near-by Fort Ripley. Enmegahbowh prevented other Ojibwa bands from joining the Gull Lake Band, for which Chief Hole in the Day imprisoned him. Enmegahbowh escaped and traveled thirty miles at night to warn Fort Ripley. This discouraged the Gull Lake Band from attacking the fort. However, many Ojibwe resented Enmegahbowh's actions for years, even though he followed his people (and the Gull Lake band and other Ojibwa) when they were removed to the environs of the Leech Lake Indian Reservation and then eventually to the White Earth Indian Reservation.

In 1867 Bishop Henry Benjamin Whipple ordained Enmegahbowh a priest. In 1869 he encouraged Chief White Cloud's mission to establish peace between the Ojibwe and the Sioux in 1869.

In March 1880, Enmegahbowh and Chief Fine-Day traveled across the eastern United States for three months in order to raise money for a new St. Columba Episcopal Church at White Earth. While in Ohio, they impressed the governor, and also addressed the Ohio state legislature, raising $6000 for their project. After Chief Fine-Day died in 1883, Enmegahbowh referred to him as "our noblest chief" and recommended that a stained glass window in the church memorialize him.

== Death and legacy ==
Enmegahbowh died at the White Earth Indian Reservation in northern Minnesota on June 12, 1902 at the age of 95, and is buried in St. Columba's churchyard. The people of St. Columba's honor him each June during the White Earth Pow-Wow. The Episcopal calendar of saints remembers Enmegahbowh on June 12.

Owanah Anderson, in Jamestown Commitment: The Episcopal Church and the American Indian, states that "Church historians have slighted the role of an Indian man, Enmegahbowh, in chronicling the coming of Christianity to the Ojibwa of northern Minnesota. While Whipple was the broker, Enmegahbowh was the implementer. While Whipple would come to be known as Apostle to the Indians, it was Enmegahbowh who served as the bishop's enabler, loyal companion, associate, and interpreter for more than 40 years." He is memorialized in the Enmegahbowh Healing and Reconciliation Station at St. Mark's Cathedral, Minneapolis.
