= Gull Lake (Cass County, Minnesota) =

Lake in Minnesota, United States

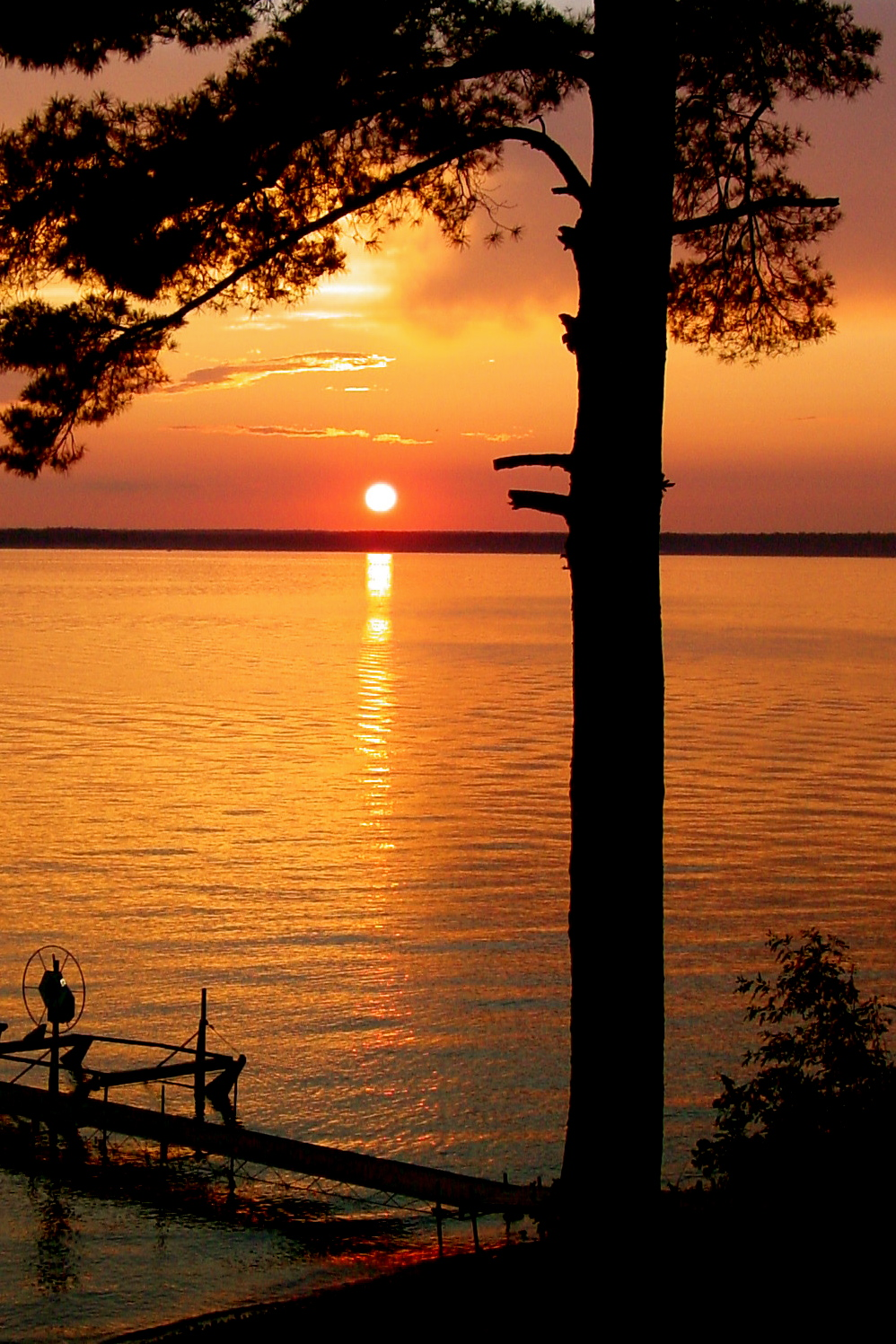
- Gull Lake sunset, July 2008

- Location within Minnesota Location within the United States
- Location: Cass / Crow Wing counties, Minnesota, United States
- Coordinates: 46.4463788°N 94.3509900°W
- Primary outflows: Gull River
- Catchment area: Crow Wing Watershed
- Basin countries: United States
- Max. length: 15.3 mi (25 km)
- Max. width: 3.3 mi (5 km)
- Surface area: 9,947.03 acres (40.2542 km^{2})
- Average depth: 30 ft (9 m)
- Max. depth: 80 ft (24 m)
- Water volume: 298,410 acre⋅ft (0.36808 km^{3})
- Shore length^{1}: 38 mi (61 km)
- Surface elevation: 1,253 ft (382 m)
- Settlements: East Gull Lake
- ^{1} Shore length is not a well-defined measure.

Gull Lake

Gull Lake is a lake in the U.S. state of Minnesota, located in Cass County and Crow Wing County. It is one of the largest lakes in the Brainerd, Minnesota-Baxter, Minnesota area and also one of the most popular for vacationing and for recreation. Of the seven Gull Lakes in Minnesota, this Gull Lake is the largest in area and shoreline. The shoreline is highly developed with residential and commercial interests. For each shoreline mile there are 27.8 homes or cabins. There are 19 resorts on Gull Lake, including notably Cragun's, Madden's, and Grand View Lodge.

== History ==
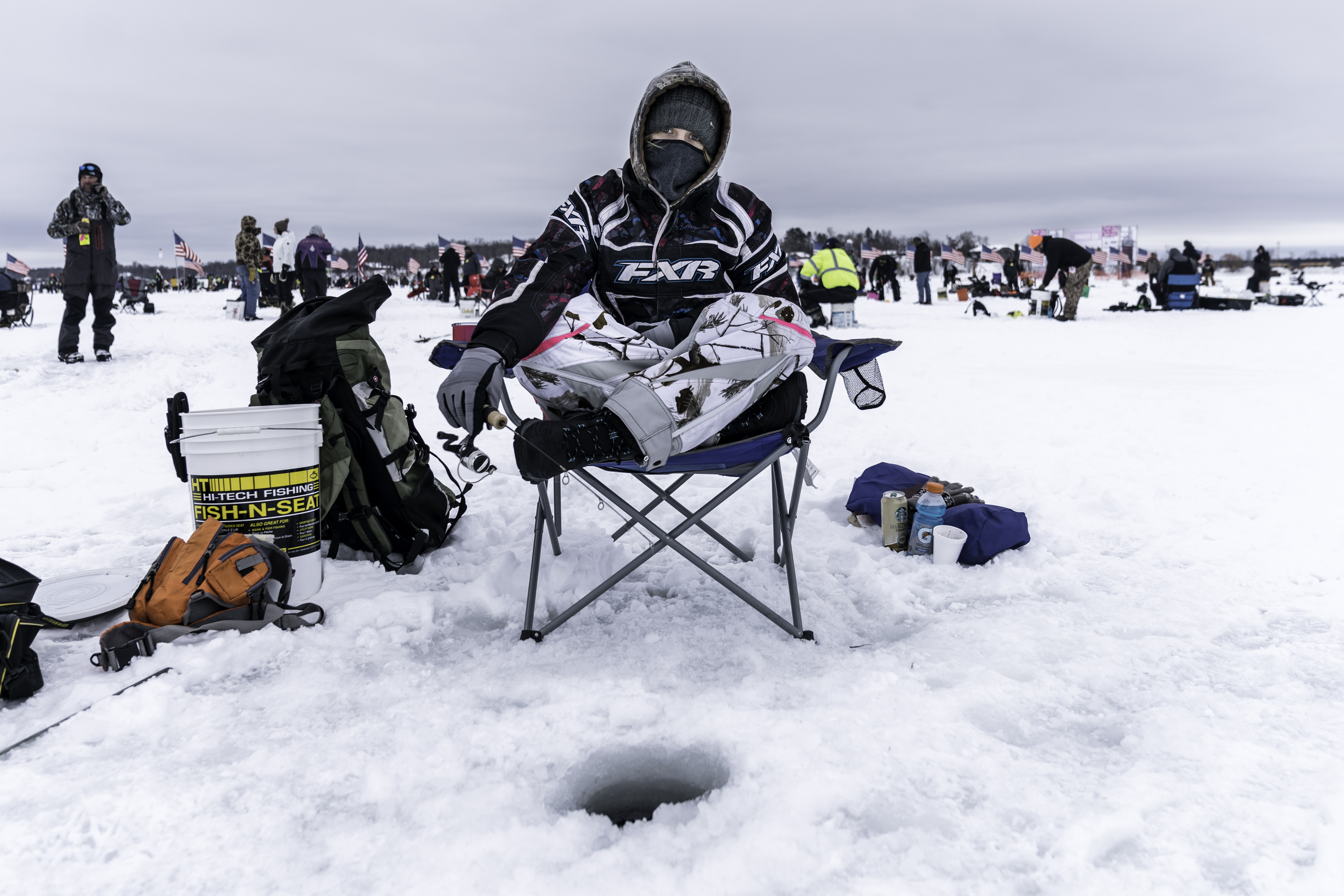
Ice fishing at The Brainerd Jaycees Ice Fishing Extravaganza

Gull Lake was raised approximately five feet by the construction of Gull Lake Dam about a half mile down Gull River from the lake's outlet. The dam began service in 1912. Prior to this, logging interests would build temporary dams at the site. The dam was the final Mississippi Headwaters reservoir dam. Colonel Francis R. Shunk and George Freeman designed Gull Lake dam. Both are more well known for designing the Lock and Dam Number 1 on the Mississippi River in 1917 in Minneapolis, MN.

The site of the Gull Lake Dam has particular prehistoric archaeological significance. Under the site there have been found at least 12 burial mounds as well as several partial mounds. All are thought to originate from the Woodland American Indian tribes, which resided in the area from 800 B.C. to A.D. 200, returning later to inhabit the area from A.D. 600 to A.D. 900. The National Register of Historic Places recognizes these burial mounds.

The site of St. Columba Mission on the eastern side of the lake is also listed on the National Register.

In present day, the Gull Lake area has many amenities and houses, as it is close to Nisswa, and both of these places are common places to vacation. There are resorts including Grandview Lodge, Cragun's Resort, and Madden's Resort, have many golf courses and vacationers contribute significantly to the local economy during the summer. The cabins along Gull Lake tend to be very expensive.

=== Ice fishing contest ===
Gull Lake is the site of the annual Brainerd Ice Fishing Extravaganza, a charitable ice fishing contest hosted by Jaycees Brainerd. 20,000 ice fishing holes are drilled into the ice on Gull Lake for the event.

== Physical features ==
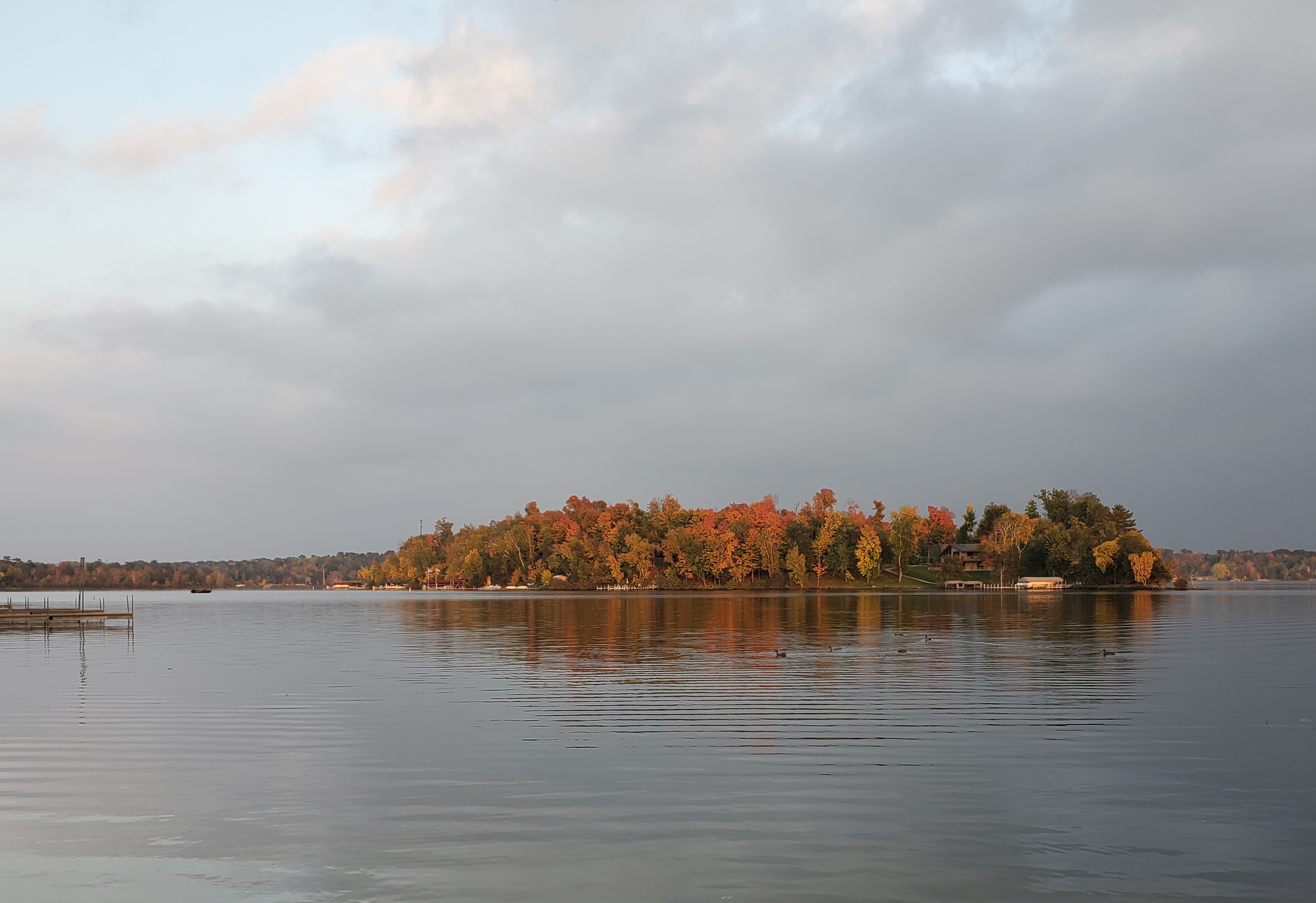
The island in East Gull Lake, Minnesota

At 9,947.03 acres (40.2542 km^{2}) surface area, Gull Lake is the largest lake within the city limits of East Gull Lake, Minnesota. The lake's maximum depth is 80 feet (24 m) with nearly 30% of the lake only 15 feet (5 m) or less. These shallow waters consist primarily of sand and gravel. There are also areas of rubble and boulder.

Gull lake is 15.3 miles (25 km) long and 3.3 miles (5 km) wide, with a median depth of 30 feet (9 m). Gull lake is part of the Crow Wing watershed. The shoreland is zoned for general development.

Stony Brook stream's mouth is at Gull Lake. The brown trout of Stony Brook were recently noticed as threatened by the recreational activity on Gull Lake. The stream's natural habitat for trout has been a focus point of restoration work by local anglers and MDNR fisheries biologists.

== Wildlife ==
There are over 35 species of aquatic life in the water of Gull Lake, which help to maintain a large fish population. The emergent bulrush plant is especially important for providing a habitat for bass and panfish species.

Anglers are attracted to the stocked walleye population in Gull Lake. Since 2003, at least 2,825,000 fry Walleye have been stocked into Gull Lake by the Minnesota Department of Natural Resources. As of 2007 the average length and weight of a walleye in Gull lake was 14.6 inches (37 cm) and 1.3 pounds (0.6 kg). Another popular catch is Northern Pike, whose length and weight are, on average, 25.8 inches (66 cm) and 4.0 pounds (1.8 kg), respectively.

== The Gull Chain ==
The Gull Chain of Lakes, for which Gull Lake is the namesake and largest member, is a collection of eight connected lakes and two bays:

- Gull Lake
- Upper Gull Lake
- Nisswa Lake (not always considered part of the chain)
- Roy Lake
- Margaret Lake
- Spider Lake (not always considered part of the chain)
- Spring Lake
- Love Lake
- Round Lake
- Bass Lake
- Steamboat Bay
- Wilson's Bay

The chain collectively covers 13,000 acres (53 km^{2}) and its shores host over 2,500 homes. The chain spans across Cass County, MN and Crow Wing County, MN. Mayo and Sibley lakes are also connected to Gull Lake via Mayo Creek. Cullen lakes are connected to Gull via creek from Cullen to Lake Nisswa. Long Lake is connected to Round via Sugar Bush Creek. Round is part of the Gull Chain. Lake Hubert is connect to Lake Edward which flows into Lake Nisswa (Gull Chain)

== Name change ==
On August 6, 2007, the MDNR Commissioner approved name changes to many bodies of water in Cass County containing the derogatory word Squaw. Squaw Point of Leech Lake became Oak Point, Squaw Lake became Little Woman Lake, Squaw Pond became Scout Camp Pond, and Squaw Point of Gull Lake became Gull Point.

== Places of interest on Gull Lake ==
- Steam Boat Bay, upon whose shores Maddens and Cragun's reside.
- Gull Point, commonly known as Squaw Point, popular boating attraction for its nearby sand bar.
- Wilson Bay
- Sandy Point
- Rocky Point
- Grassy Point
- Dutchman's Bluff
- Sheafer Point
- Holman's Point
- Government Point
- Floan's Point
- Hunter's Point, known for its dangerously shallow straight

== Towns near Gull Lake ==
- East Gull Lake, Minnesota
- Nisswa, Minnesota
- Brainerd, Minnesota
- Lake Shore, Minnesota
- Baxter, Minnesota
