= Marston T. Bogert =

American chemist (1868–1954)

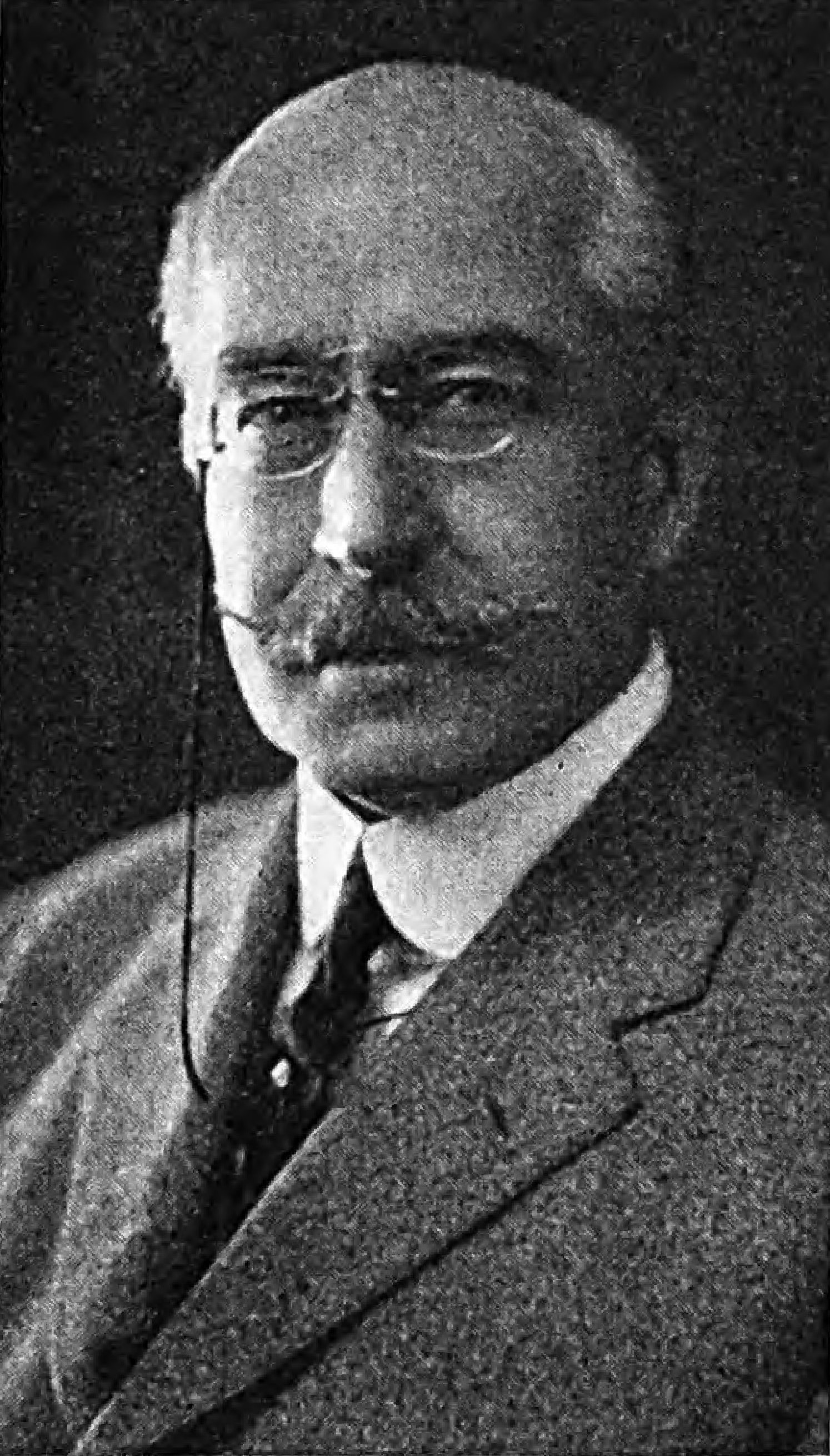
- Bogert in a 1926 publication
- Born: Marston Taylor Bogert; April 18, 1868; Flushing, New York, U.S.
- Died: March 21, 1954 (aged 85); Islip, Long Island, New York, U.S.
- Education: Flushing Institute; Columbia University (AB); Columbia School of Mines (PhB)
- Awards: William H. Nichols Medal (1906); Priestley Medal (1938); Charles Frederick Chandler Medal (1949)
- Scientific career
- Fields: Organic Chemistry
- Notable students: Hal Trueman Beans, J. M. Nelson, Michael Heidelberger, Foster D. Snell, George Scatchard

Marston Taylor Bogert (April 18, 1868 – March 21, 1954) was an American chemist.

== Biography ==
He was born in Flushing, New York on April 18, 1868 and studied at the Flushing Institute.

He entered Columbia College in New York in 1886 and graduated in 1890 with an A.B. degree. He then entered the new Columbia School of Mines and completed a Ph.B. degree in analytical and applied chemistry in 1894. He stayed on to teach organic chemistry and in 1904 was appointed a full professor, retiring in 1939 as emeritus Professor of Organic Chemistry in Residence.

He was president of the American Chemical Society 1907-8 and president of the Society of Chemical Industry in 1912.

During the First World War, Bogert initially served as chief of the Technical & Consulting Section of the Chemical Industry Branch of the War Industries Board before joining the U.S. Army Chemical Warfare Service. He was commissioned as a lieutenant colonel on March 9, 1918, promoted to colonel on July 13, 1918 and honorably discharged from active duty on May 1, 1919. After joining the U.S. Army, he continued to serve in the Chemical Warfare Section of the Chemical Division of the War Industries Board.

== Honors and awards ==
- 1900: He was made a fellow of the American Association for the Advancement of Science
- 1905: Awarded the William H. Nichols Medal
- 1909: He was elected to the American Philosophical Society
- 1909: Awarded an honorary LL.D. degree by Clark University
- 1914: He was elected to the American Academy of Arts and Sciences
- 1916: He was elected to the National Academy of Sciences.
- 1929: Awarded an honorary Sc.D. degree by Columbia University
- 1936: Awarded the American Institute of Chemists Gold Medal
- 1938: Awarded the Priestley Medal by the American Chemical Society.
- From 1938 to 1947, he was the president of IUPAC.
- 1949: Awarded the Chandler Medal by Columbia University

== Personal ==
Bogert was the son of Henry A. Bogert and Mary B. (Lawrence) Bogert.

On September 12, 1893, he married Charlotte E. Hoogland.

A resident of Manhattan, Bogert died at a convalescent home in Islip on Long Island on March 21, 1954.
