= St. Paul's College and Grammar School =

Former secondary school in Flushing, New York

Location
- College Point, Queens, New York City, New York; United States
- 40°47′34″N 73°50′54″W

Information
- School type: Private, Secondary boarding school
- Established: 1838
- Founder: William Augustus Muhlenberg
- Closed: 1848
- Principal: William Augustus Muhlenberg (1838-1845); John Graeff Barton (1845-1848)
- Gender: Boys

St. Paul's College and Grammar School was an American independent secondary boarding school located in College Point, New York.

== History ==
St. Paul's College and Grammar School was established in the mid-to-late 1830s by William Augustus Muhlenberg, who was then rector of Flushing, New York's St. George's Church.

Muhlenberg, founder of the Flushing Institute in 1828, developed more ambitious plans for higher Christian education by the mid-1830s. Muhlenberg, having received his Divinity degree around 1836, envisioned a more complete college institution. He secured a 175-acre property in Strattonsport, later renamed College Point. The site was located near the intersection of Poppenhusen Avenue and College Place. He made his first attempt at establishing St. Paul's College on the site, laying the cornerstone of a projected $50,000 stone building on October 15, 1836. Francis Lister Hawks, later of St. Thomas' Hall, delivered the oration. Construction halted at the foundation after the Panic of 1837 prevented all further building of the projected college edifice. Financial ruin forced many of Muhlenberg's backers to abandon the project. The pledged contributions to fund and endow the college never materialized.

As temporary quarters were built for the college, the Flushing Institute relocated two miles northwest within College Point. When Muhlenberg's pupils relocated, the former building of the Flushing Institute was occupied as a girls school known as St. Ann's Hall.

St. Paul's College and Grammar School opened in 1838, once wooden buildings next to the grammar school were completed. The original cornerstone box from Flushing was unearthed and reburied at the new location. "It was deposited unopened," Muhlenberg wrote, "to show the identity of the institution." By 1840, the combined buildings measured 232 feet wide with 125-foot wings. The college served 105 students, maintained a 7,000-volume library, and held $70,000 in property, with $9,000 spent annually on salaries. A letter signed by the faculty head on January 13, 1840, requested degree-granting authority from the Board of Regents of the University of the State of New York. Reluctant to authorize degrees for a sectarian school, the legislature withheld approval of his request. The school was unable to award Bachelor of Arts degrees without an official collegiate charter.

While over half the student body came from New York State, the college also attracted Southerners, a few New Englanders, and students from distant areas including Michigan Territory, the West Indies, and Lower Canada.

St. Paul's curriculum combined classical and modern instruction: seven of twelve professors taught languages and rhetoric, while others focused on mathematics, natural philosophy, chemistry, and mineralogy. Subjects under arithmetic and mathematics included geography, surveying, navigation, chemistry, botany, and astronomy. Classical language studies involved texts like the Epistles and gospels, Iliad, De Corona, Memorabilia, Analecta Græca Minora, and Theophrastus. French instruction featured Molière, François-René de Chateaubriand, Alphonse de Lamartine, and Jean de La Fontaine. Outside of Sunday Bible study, religious teaching emphasized early Church history and biographies. Additional courses included Evidences and Ethics of Christianity, History and Constitutional Law, and Antiquities and Geography. Though grounded in classical education, Muhlenberg's vision for the school shifted toward ecclesiastical education and preparation for Episcopal ministry and mission work.

In the 1840–41 academic year, the faculty of St. Paul's College included W. A. Muhlenberg (rector and professor of Evidences and Ethics of Christianity); Christian F. Crusé (professor of Hebrew, Greek, and Latin); Charles Gill (professor of Mathematics and Natural Philosophy); J. G. Barton (professor of Greek and Latin); Newton May (professor of Chemistry and Mineralogy, and resident physician); Libertus Van Bokkelen (secretary and assistant professor of Mathematics and Natural Philosophy); John Barrett Kerfoot (chaplain and assistant professor of Greek and Latin); J. Huntingdon (assistant professor of Rhetoric and Intellectual Philosophy); and Joseph Lipnski (professor of French and German). Department instructors included James S. Bowdler, Reuben Riley, Robert S. Howland, Charles Bancroft, and Henry M. Sheafe. There was also a professor and instructor of Music and an instructor of Drawing.

Schroeder, rector of St. Ann's Hall, did an oration at St. Paul's College on July 5, 1841.

In 1843, Muhlenberg left for Europe and entrusted Bishop Jonathan Mayhew Wainwright with its oversight.

The Christian college prospered until the mid-1840s. Muhlenberg departed after eighteen years at the Flushing Institute and St. Paul's to head the Church of the Holy Communion in New York City.

== Closure ==
John Graeff Barton, senior professor of Greek and Latin and vice rector, succeeded Muhlenberg, but the work soon declined. Within three to four years, St. Paul's College closed around 1848, and its property was sold to a private buyer.

The partially-built stone building (for which construction was halted after the Panic of 1837) was completed by Muhlenberg's sister and later became a mansion for the Chisolm family. This property was acquired in 1930 by the City of New York and turned into a public park (now Hermon A. MacNeil Park); the mansion was used by Mayor Fiorello La Guardia as his summer City Hall from 1937 until the building was demolished between 1939 and 1941.

== See also ==
- College Point, New York
