= John Barrett Kerfoot =

Irish bishop and educator

The Right Reverend John Barrett Kerfoot D.D., LL.D.
- Bishop of Pittsburgh
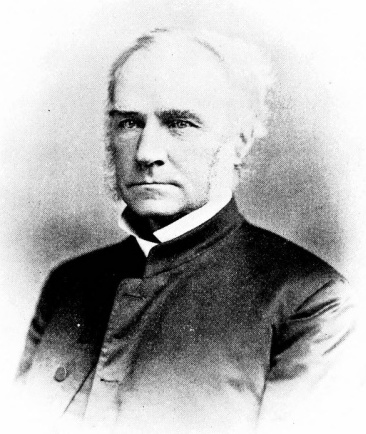
- Church: Episcopal Church
- Diocese: Pittsburgh
- Elected: November 15, 1865
- In office: 1866–1881
- Successor: Cortlandt Whitehead

Orders
- Ordination: March 1, 1837 by Benjamin T. Onderdonk
- Consecration: January 25, 1866 by John Henry Hopkins

Personal details
- Born: March 1, 1816 Dublin, Dublin County, Ireland
- Died: July 10, 1881 (aged 65) Meyersdale, Pennsylvania, United States
- Buried: Homewood Cemetery
- Denomination: Anglican
- Parents: Richard Kerfoot & Christiana Barrett
- Spouse: Eliza Matilda Anderson
- Children: Rev. Able Anderson Kerfoot, Christiana Kerfoot
- Profession: Educator, clergyman

John Barrett Kerfoot (March 1, 1816 – July 10, 1881) served as Rector of the College of St. James near Hagerstown, Maryland, as President of Trinity College in Hartford, Connecticut, and as the first Bishop of the Episcopal Diocese of Pittsburgh, Pennsylvania.

== Early life ==
John Barrett Kerfoot was born on March 1, 1816, in Dublin, Ireland. His parents, Richard Kerfoot and Christiana Barrett, were Scotch-Irish, by descent, brought up in the Church of Ireland, but afterwards connected with the Wesleyans. Richard Kerfoot and his family moved to Lancaster, Pennsylvania in 1819, where he was successful in business. However, he "lost a considerable sum of money from endorsing notes for his friends".

Richard Kerfoot died of "inflammatory fever" in 1825. His son John said that he remembered his father as he was dying "blessing him and giving him his dying counsels," such as "to be a good boy, to say his prayers regularly, to read his Bible, and to obey and take care of his mother." The children "loved and reverenced" their mother who died in the summer of 1858.

== Education ==
John Kerfoot's "earliest secular education" began in a school in Lancaster that used the "Lancastrian" or Monitorial System, in which older students taught the younger ones.

From age six until Kerfoot began his theological studies in 1833, the Rev. William Augustus Muhlenberg was "a major influence" in Kerfoot's life and the primary factor in his education. Muhlenberg was "unequalled in some respects as an educator of youth." He came to Lancaster in 1820 as associate rector of St. James's Church, Lancaster and opened a Church Sunday-School. Kerfoot began attending the school when he was six years old.

In 1826, Muhlenberg moved from Lancaster to Flushing, on Long Island. Two years later he opened the "Flushing Institute." By the generosity of Miss Yeates, Kerfoot's Sunday School teacher in Lancaster, the twelve-year-old Kerfoot was enabled to attend the Flushing Institute, where he was again "under the care and instruction" of Muhlenberg. At age 14, on February 24, 1830, Kerfoot wrote about his gratefulness for being in Flushing Institute under the influence of Dr. Muhlenberg. In March 1832, Kerfoot wrote about spending his seventeenth birthday at the Flushing Institute and about having a paper on "Private Prayer" he had written published in The Churchman.

Kerfoot was confirmed on April 19, 1832, by the Rt. Rev. Benjamin T. Onderdonk, Bishop of Episcopal Diocese of New York.

=== Theological education ===
Kerfoot's goal had always been the holy ministry. In 1833, he became a candidate for Holy Orders and began his theological studies. During his first year of theological studies, he had an essay published in the Churchman.

Kerfoot was ordained to the diaconate on March 1, 1837 (Kerfoot's twenty-first birthday) by Bishop Onderdonk.

Kerfoot stayed on at the Flushing Institute after completing his studies as Muhlenberg's "principal assistant" until he left to become Rector of the College of St. James in Maryland in 1843.

== Ministry in New York ==
On March 5, 1837, after having been ordained Deacon, Kerfoot described his "first Sunday in the ministry. I have read the service and preached twice to-day, morning and evening, in St. John's Church, York, Pennsylvania." In March 1838, Kerfoot wrote that, while remaining at the Flushing Institute, he would do "ministerial" work at Zion Church, Little Neck, near College Point. Kerfoot was ordained to the Priesthood on March 1, 1840, by Bishop Onderdonk.

In February 1841, Kerfoot was offered the position as head of Nashotah House, a new "religious house". However, he turned down the offer.

The Rt. Rev. William Rollinson Whittingham, bishop of the Episcopal Church's Diocese of Maryland, called Kerfoot to head the College of St. James in Maryland. Kerfoot accepted this offer and, thus, he moved from the Flushing Institute to Maryland.

In June 1841, before his move to Maryland, Kerfoot was offered the position of President of Kemper College, Missouri. Having already accepted the call to head the College of St. James, he declined this offer.

In the summer of 1841, Kerfoot and Miss Eliza M. Anderson became engaged. In September 1842, they were married in St. John's Chapel, New York. One week later, the couple moved to "Fountain Rock" near Hagerstown, Maryland, the site purchased for the construction of the College of St. James. This became "the scene of his educational labors and happy married life for the next twenty-two years." However, the Kerfoots' marriage was vitiated by the death of four children.

The Diocese of Maryland, to which Kerfoot was about to transfer his educational labors, was at that time presided over by Bishop Whittingham William Rollinson Whittingham.

== College of St. James ==
Kerfoot spent twenty-three years of his ordained ministry as Rector of the College of St. James. Kerfoot himself called them "happy years of my life" and added that his heart was bound to the college "by sorrows as well as by joys, by disappointment as well as by success."

The college "owed its origin to the Rt. Rev. William Rollinson Whittingham, " bishop of the Episcopal Church's Diocese of Maryland. The purpose of the college was to "give a high grade of education under the influences of the Episcopal Church."

After property had been purchased, Whittingham needed to find a head for the school. He looked to the Rev. William Augustus Muhlenberg who headed a school in College Point, NY. Muhlenberg refused the offer, but suggested and offered his "principal assistant" the Rev. John Barrett Kerfoot who had been educated by him. The school was incorporated as the College of St. James in 1843 with Kerfoot as its head.

"The Rector and his assistant teachers were obliged to work without salaries at first, receiving only their board and lodging from the Institution."

Under Kerfoot, the college and its preparatory school were an almost immediate success. Kerfoot followed Muhlenberg's example that "combined thorough religious instruction with the usual secular education." He hired "a small, largely northern, faculty, and soon attracted students from wealthy families all over the South." In the college chapel, Kerfoot was "an able and successful preacher." In his preaching, "his statements of truth and duty . . . ; the illustrations and examples were most pertinent."

The first year, in spite of the financial difficulties, the college was doing well "until the health of the Rector completely broke down." It was a recurrence of Bronchitis that made preaching and teaching impossible, It was hoped that a voyage to England would remedy the condition.

The return voyage was stormy and when near land the ship ran aground. All on board the ship were for thirteen hours in danger of death until their rescue. After their rescue, the captain and passengers spoke of the "help given them" by Kerfoot. The trip did not serve its purpose, because on December 14, 1843, having returned from England, Kerfoot wrote, "my health generally is much improved; my throat is not any better. I am forbidden preaching or teaching for nearly a year."

The college and preparatory school attracted students. In 1848, St. James had 98 students and in 1857 it had 117. By the end of term in June 1861, there were "almost 175 students." The college had "every prospect of permanence" until the Civil War was declared.

In spite of the war, Kerfoot and his staff were determined to keep the college going and opened the October 1862 session with "between forty and fifty students." However, by June 25, 1863, there were only 12 students and all from Washington County in which the college was located.

The college became the "pivot of the strife of the two armies." Two major battles, the Battle of South Mountain and the Battle of Antietam, were fought only a few miles away. Kerfoot and his mainly Union sympathizers staff gave "every possible assistance to the wounded, Confederate or Union." Kerfoot was "unwearied in his visitations to the hospitals," while doing his duties as "pastor and ruler of the little community" of the college.

After Confederate troops were defeated in Battle of Gettysburg, Lee began his retreat back into Virginia. The college was sacked several times by the retreating Confederate troops who were like a "vagabond mob of a beaten army."

In spite of these blows, Kerfoot, with his faculty and staff, kept the college going until the summer of 1864 when Kerfoot was arrested by the Confederates. He was later released.

After Kerfoot's release, it had become evident that the 1863-1864 session was "likely to be the last session of St. James's College." Therefore, Kerfoot "finally decided that St. James's must be given up and accepted the Presidency of Trinity College, Hartford."

The property on which the College of St. James was built is now the location of Saint James School, a coeducational college preparatory school.

== President of Trinity College ==
In 1864, the College of St. James had been closed. After much consideration of his options, Kerfoot decided that "St. James must be given up." So he accepted the Presidency of Trinity College in Hartford, Connecticut. He began his presidency "worn out and exhausted by the protracted cares and anxieties which had come upon him during the Civil War."

At Trinity College, by Commencement Day in the summer of 1865, there was great enthusiasm about Kerfoot's becoming its new president. His inaugural address on the nature of "The Christian College" was "very warmly received."

The Civil War had wrought a devastating impact on Trinity College. Many of its students from Union states had been "drawn away into the ranks of the army." What had been a "considerable" number of students from states that seceded as part of the Confederacy had been reduced to zero. Thus, Trinity College was in serious straits. Kerfoot's taking the office of president "was the turning of the tide" for the college. Even though Kerfoot's time as president was brief, the effectiveness of his administration was demonstrated by fact that the college moved "forward so strongly and well in the years" after he left.

In 1865, the Diocese of Connecticut elected him a Deputy to the twenty-eighth General Convention held October 4–24, 1865. This meeting authorized the formation of the new Episcopal Diocese of Pittsburgh. At a meeting to elect a bishop, Kerfoot was chosen on the first ballot. He accepted the election.

When Kerfoot was elected Bishop of Pittsburgh, the trustees, the students, the alumni, and the clergy of Connecticut wanted him to remain at the college "whose prospects were just then becoming very bright." However, Kerfoot believed that it was "his duty to accept" his call to the episcopacy and to end "his long, arduous academical career."

== Bishop of Pittsburgh ==
Kerfoot would have been willing to remain at Trinity College and continue his work in Church education. However, he believed that "it was his duty to accept" his election as the first bishop of the new Diocese of Pittsburgh. Therefore, on December 5, 1865, he sent notice of his acceptance to the Presiding Bishop."

Kerfoot was consecrated on the feast of the Conversion of St. Paul, January 25, 1866, in Pittsburgh.

The consecration in Trinity Church, Pittsburgh, of which the Presiding Bishop John Henry Hopkins had once been the rector. The congregation was so large that many people were unable to find standing-room.

Immediately after his consecration, Kerfoot began his work as bishop. His first official act that day was to receive his son, Abel Anderson Kerfoot, as a candidate for Holy Orders. That night, Kerfoot presided at a missionary and prayer-book meeting and delivered an address. On the following Tuesday, January 30, he consecrated Trinity Church, New Castle, Pennsylvania. That evening, at the same church, Kerfoot held his first Confirmation."

The new Diocese needed to be strengthened and enlarged. Kerfoot worked at this by spending several days when he made his parish visitations. During that time, he visited and made friends with the laity. He also held services in towns where no Episcopal Church clergyman had ever been seen as a way of starting new parishes. By such actions, Kerfoot won the "affection and confidence" of church people. Because of this, they were "liberal and ready" to contribute to diocesan projects such as the Church Home and the Church Guild. People, not only Episcopalians, learned to respect Kerfoot.

Kerfoot "allowed himself but little rest." He wrote many letters to clergymen and laymen who asked his advice. He also had to travel to Trinity College to perform some duties to which he was committed.

=== First illness as bishop ===
On Easter Tuesday, April 3, 1866, Kerfoot participated in the service at Trinity Church by reading the ante-Communion. After that, he met with the Board of Diocesan Missions from 10:45 until 1:30. During the last half hour, he began to feel weak and bewildered, as he later wrote, very weak. He said that he "broke down utterly; body feeble, mind and memory confused," so he had to stop work and cancel a visit to Meadville. By the next day, Kerfoot was still "very weak, but better." He blamed his illness on "nervous prostration from Hospital fever, the hot weather, and overwork." By April 16, he was much better and began to resume his work.

=== First diocesan convention ===
Kerfoot's first Diocesan Convention assembled in Pittsburgh on May 16, 1866, but he was unable to participate in it fully. On the opening day, he met with Diocesan Board of Missions in Trinity Church from 10.30 a. m. to 1.30 p. m. and again from 3:00 p. m. to 4.30 p. m. At 5:00 p. m., he opened the Diocesan Convention with prayers, and presided till adjournment at 6.30 p. m. At 8:00 p. m., he presided at a Diocesan Missionary Meeting at St. Andrew's Church till 10:00 p. m. After that he said that he was "very weary, exhausted and sick."

Kerfoot missed the morning session of the second day of the convention because of his sickness. In the afternoon session he read his Episcopal address to the convention. That night, he had to miss a Prayer-Book Meeting in Trinity Church. He attended the third day of the convention, but did not preside. At 5:00 p. m., he closed the convention with an address and prayers.

=== Progress in diocese ===
Kerfoot facilitated much progress in his diocese in his first two years.

==== More clergy ====
In 1866, Kerfoot began his work with thirty-three clergy in the diocese. In two years this number had grown to forty-nine. His clergy "gave him unreserved sympathy and love; they worked for and with him. Also, the laity trusted their bishop and responded with liberality.

==== The Church Home ====
The Church Home in Pittsburgh had existed since 1859, but it was "weak and struggling" without sufficient income. The Home was originally for old members of the Church, but it soon admitted young children also. Thus, when Kerfoot visited the Home two days after his consecration, he found it to be a "struggling" institution. He raised sufficient funds to provide religious services and classes for its residents. One of Kerfoot's last official acts was laying the cornerstone of an addition that contained a chapel, rooms for old women, and an infirmary.

==== The Church Guild ====
In his first year as bishop, Kerfoot organized the Church Guild. Its purpose was "to bring Churchmen together socially and in the unity of interest" in the work of the diocese. The Guild owned its building that included a library and reading-room. This was made possible by the contributions of laymen.

==== Schools ====
Education in the Muhlenberg tradition was a favorite ministry of Bishop Kerfoot. An 1868 diocesan committee on education encouraged creation of low-fee schools supervised by parish rectors. It also encouraged the founding of secondary schools for boys and girls from the "wealthy class." One such school was Trinity Hall School for Boys in Washington, Pennsylvania, that operated from 1879 to 1906.

By his seventh year as bishop, Kerfoot noted the diocese had increased the number of working-class parishioners by two-thirds. This included a strong focus on ministry to coal minters of English descent.

=== Attended the first Lambeth Conference in 1867 ===
Kerfoot accepted the Archbishop of Canterbury's invitation to the first Lambeth Conference.

While in England, Kerfoot preached on several occasions for the Society for the Propagation of the Gospel. He also "preached and spoke" in many places by invitation.

The University of Cambridge conferred the honorary degree of LL. D. on Kerfoot and six other American bishops.

=== Ritualism ===
Kerfoot rejected Anglo-Catholic tendencies but was decidedly High Church. As part of the Tractarian movement, Ritualism increased during Kerfoot's episcopate. The word Ritualism refers to the introduction of new vestments and ceremonies in worship to symbolize certain doctrines. Ritualism was a reaction from a "coldness and baldness" in worship. Kerfoot supported the aesthetic side of Ritualism. However, he opposed doctrines connected with Ritualism about the Holy Eucharist and "sacramental confession" as contrary to the Book of Common Prayer and the Thirty-nine Articles of Religion. He forbade the Anglo-Catholic practice of bowing at the altar because it implied "carnal presence."

In controversies regarding Ritualism, Kerfoot "endeavored to act fairly towards all." At the same time, he tried to prevent excess and insure obedience to the Book of Common Prayer by his clergy. Surviving correspondence between Hill Burgwin of the diocesan standing committee shows leaders blocked the appointment of a Low Churchman because his views were not "harmonious" with Kerfoot's High Church practices.

=== Influence at General Convention ===
Kerfoot's influence in the affairs of the Episcopal Church "increased rapidly." He took a "prominent part" in his second General Convention of 1871. He had gained the "confidence of his brethren" by his "executive capacity" and his "strong common sense." Kerfoot was elected by General Convention as a trustee of the General Theological Seminary.

Kerfoot attended two more General Conventions (1874 and 1877). However, by the 1880 Convention he was too ill to attend.

=== Summary of first seven years as bishop ===
In 1873, Kerfoot wrote a summary of the growth in his diocese during his first seven years as bishop:

- twenty-seven new churches had been built (five of these replacing former and inferior ones);
- ten more churches had been enlarged and refitted;
- seven new churches were being built, and four more were to be begin building soon;
- the building outlay, so far, had been about $570,000; two-thirds or more of this outside of Pittsburgh, and mostly spent in small churches;
- the number of communicants had grown from 2000 to 4000;
- the number of working class communicants had grown by two-thirds;
- Confirmations were somewhat above the average (i. e., one-tenth of the communicants);
- Diocesan missions had received $1.30 per communicant yearly;
- most older churches had been revived and strengthened;
- at forty places, which had not been reached in 1866, there were now services;
- there was peace and order in the Diocese.

=== Second illness as bishop ===
In the spring of 1873, Kerfoot had "an alarming illness, which was nearly fatal." Although he lived and worked seven more years after this severe attack, his strong constitution had received a shock which left its mark upon him.

The following spring, because Kerfoot was still "weak and exhausted," some laymen sent him to Europe for the summer of 1874 for rest and recreation. The plan was to take a "leisurely trip." However, at the urging of the Presiding Bishop, he attended two meetings of Old Catholic Church leaders in Germany. So Kerfoot's trip included "days of full of hard, thoughtful work."

On August 21, 1874, before Kerfoot left England, Archbishop Tait wrote him asking that he ascertain from the Episcopal Church's House of Bishops "their wishes" regarding a second Lambeth Conference. On November 3, 1874, Kerfoot wrote the Archbishop that the American Bishops had expressed their that there be a second Conference.

Kerfoot attended his second Lambeth Conference in 1878 after having served as "the medium of correspondence" between the Archbishop of Canterbury Tait and the American bishops in making decisions about the time and shape of the Conference.

=== The reform movement in Mexico Commission ===
Kerfoot served on a seven-member Commission of bishops that dealt with "The Reform Movement in Mexico." At the General Convention of October 1874, the House of Bishops met in secret session to consider a memorial from "Members of the Synod of the Church of Jesus in Mexico." The memorial solicited American bishops consecrate the Rev. Dr. Riley as a bishop for their church. This was done. Kerfoot, who had had numerous interviews with Riley, supported the consecration. However, the new bishop's actions led to the House of Bishops at the General Convention of 1883 to unanimously request the "removal of his jurisdiction."

=== Final two years ===
In 1879, Kerfoot was often weary, but he still attended to his Diocesan duties. He made his visitations and preached. However, illnesses and bad news began to weigh upon him.

On October 17, 1879, Bishop Whittingham, Kerfoot's bishop while he was in Maryland and close friend for life died. Kerfoot attended the funeral in Orange, New Jersey. In the following months there were more signs of weariness with his work.

On March 1, 1880, Kerfoot's sixty-fourth birthday, he visited his doctor regarding his deafness. On May 12, 1880, Kerfoot and family, with exception of his wife, came down with Scarlet fever. On June 6, 1880, Kerfoot's only surviving son Abel, a priest, died. In addition, he suffered "bitter grief" at the failure of Bishop Riley to keep his promises to him.

Such "severe blows" to Kerfoot made him unable to carry on his work. His last year was a year of "continuous feebleness." On July 8, 1881, Kerfoot suffered another attack of paralysis and on July 10, 1881. He died in Meyersdale, Pennsylvania, eighty-six miles from Pittsburgh. His funeral was on July 13, 1881, in Trinity Church, Pittsburgh with a congregation that overflowed the building. He was buried in Homewood Cemetery.

Immediately after the funeral, the clergy of the Diocese met. In the meeting, one of the leading clergymen the Rev. Dr. William A. Hitchcock presented a Minute (i.e. a memorandum) about Kerfoot. The opening words of the Minute were
"In the simplicity and godly sincerity of his walk and conversation, in the quick and ready sympathy which he showed toward the sorrowful, the suffering and the sinful, and in the devout spirit of his public services and private life, he was a pattern to his clergy and his flock.
