= James Lloyd Breck =

American Episcopal priest and saint (1818–1876)

The Rev. James Lloyd Breck
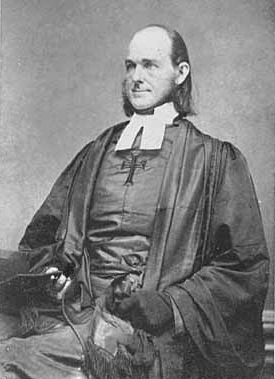
- Breck in 1866
- Born: June 27, 1818; Philadelphia County, Pennsylvania
- Died: 2 April 1876 (aged 57); Benicia, California
- Venerated in: Episcopal Church (United States)
- Feast: April 2

James Lloyd Breck (June 27, 1818 – April 2, 1876) was a priest, educator, and missionary of the Episcopal Church in the United States of America.

Breck is commemorated on April 2 on the Episcopal calendar of saints.

== Early life and education ==
Breck was born in Philadelphia County, Pennsylvania. He was the fourth son of Catherine D. née Israell and George Breck. He was baptized at All Saints Church, Torresdale, Philadelphia, in 1821.

In 1833, Breck left Bristol for the Flushing Institute (in Flushing, New York). Founded in 1828 by the Reverend William Augustus Muhlenberg, one of the great educators in American history, life in this "Church school" formed Breck in many different aspects of his human nature. Profoundly affected by the religion, personality, and many gifts of Muhlenberg, Breck resolved at age sixteen to devote himself to the work of a missionary educator. Senator James Lloyd of Massachusetts and Breck's uncle financed his education at Flushing and the University of Pennsylvania. He received a B.A. from the University of Pennsylvania in 1838 and a B.D. from the General Theological Seminary in 1841. At the seminary he was again influenced by talented professors, especially by William Whittingham, who taught Church History. From Whittingham, who from 1840 served as Bishop of Maryland, Breck acquired a deep admiration of St. Columba, the sixth-century missionary educator who established a mission station and school on the island of Iona off the coast of Scotland. While Muhlenberg called himself an "Evangelical Catholic," and Whittingham was a decided High Churchman, it is difficult to place Breck's churchmanship precisely. He is lionized by Anglo-Catholics as a founder of their movement, yet he was neither a ritualist nor a church party man. He considered himself a member and a priest of "the Holy Catholic Church" of the Creed, and he was a confident Anglican in the Episcopal denomination, but whether he was a full-blown Anglo-Catholic is difficult to establish. He never seemed to depart the religion of his "school father" Muhlenberg. (See notes on Whittingham and the high church movement.).

== Career ==
In 1842, by then a deacon in the Episcopal Church, he went to the frontier of Wisconsin with two classmates, under the direction of Bishop Jackson Kemper, to found Nashotah House, intended as a monastic community, a seminary, and a center for theological work. It continues today as a seminary. Breck was ordained into the priesthood later that year by the Missionary Bishop, Jackson Kemper at the Oneida Indian settlement 150 miles north of Nashotah.

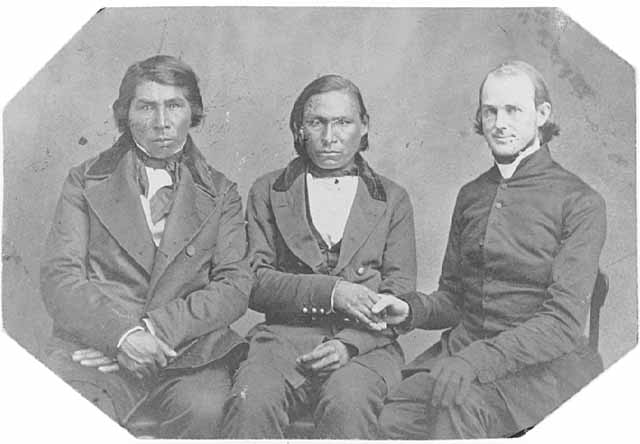
Breck (right) with Enmegahbowh (The Rev. John Johnson) (left) and Isaac Manitowab (center).

In 1850 Breck moved to Minnesota where he began another mission. On June 23, 1850 he celebrated the first Episcopal Eucharist in the La Crosse area. Two years later he began work among the Ojibway, founding St. Columba Mission.

The Native Americans trusted Breck. There was something about his earnestness, energy, and openness that disarmed the Mississippi tribes. He had a knack for communicating with them on a deep level, promising that the Great Father did not seek to destroy them but only to bring peace among the rival peoples centered round Christ Jesus the Savior of all human beings.

In 1855 Breck married Jane Maria Mills, one of the teachers at the St. Columba Mission. He opened another mission at Leech Lake in 1856, and then in 1857 he moved to Faribault where he and the Rev. Solon Manney began a mission school to train clergy to work in Minnesota missions. Breck was active in any number of ways for nine years before a bishop was appointed for Minnesota. This new bishop was Henry Whipple, who began his episcopate in 1859. The mission school for clergy became Seabury Seminary which survives today as Bexley-Seabury Western Seminary in Chicago.

Jane Breck died in 1862 and Breck married Sarah Stiles in 1864. Three years later he moved to Benicia, California to build another two institutions.

Breck was known as "The Apostle of the Wilderness".

== Death ==
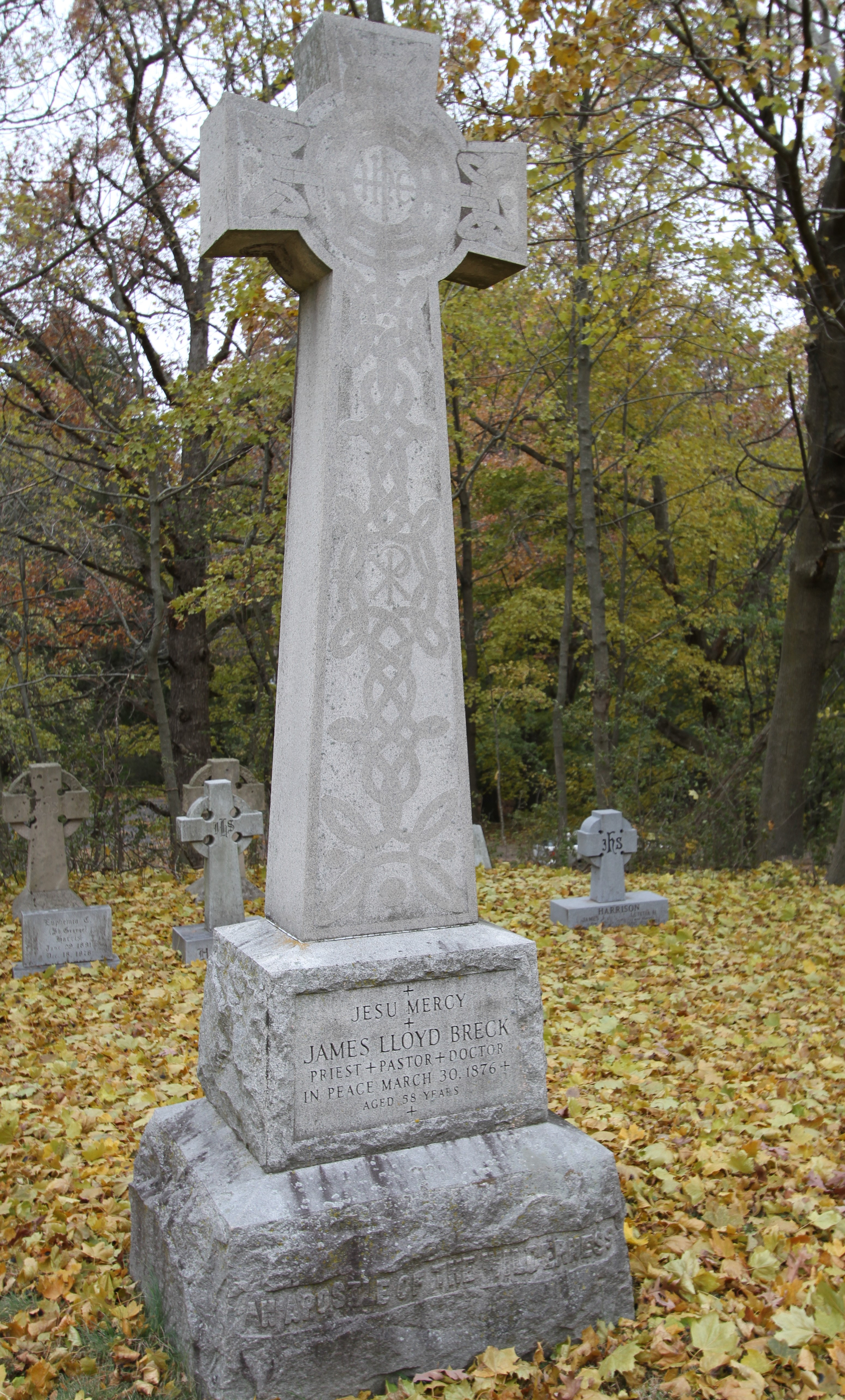
Breck's grave at Nashotah House

Breck died in Benicia in 1876. He was buried beneath the altar of the church he served as rector but later his body was removed and reinterred on the grounds of Nashotah House in Nashotah, Wisconsin. The recommittal service there had 14 bishops, about 100 priests, and many lay people in attendance.

== Legacy ==
Breck's major legacies were Nashotah House Seminary, Seabury Seminary, and several other institutions since closed including Racine College in Delafield, Wisconsin, St. Augustine College in Benicia, California, and St. Mary's School in Benicia. Breck School in Golden Valley, Minnesota, founded in 1886, was named for him.

Henry M. Ackley, who was married to Breck's niece and had been connected with Nashotah House, later became a member of the Wisconsin State Senate.

== Veneration ==
The Rev. James Lloyd Breck is commemorated on April 2 in the calendar of the Episcopal Church (USA).
