= Flushing Institute =

Former secondary school in Flushing, New York

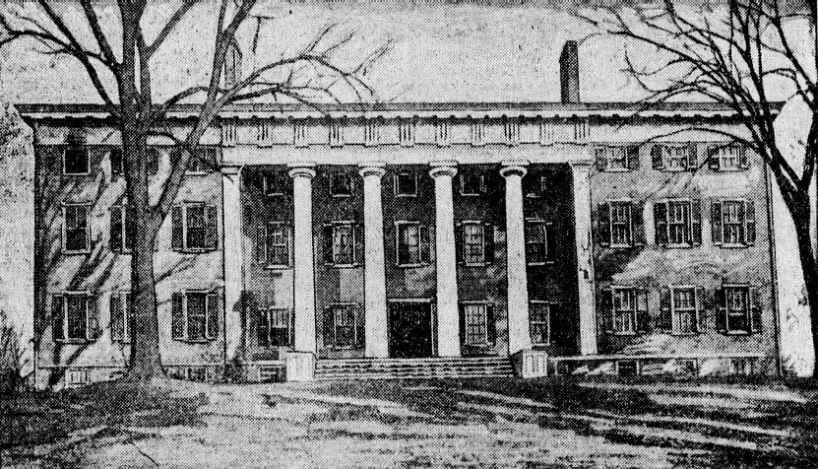

Location
- Flushing, Queens, New York; United States; 40°45′34″N 73°49′43″W

Information
- Other name: Fairchild's Institute
- School type: Private, College-preparatory school
- Established: 1828 (Muhlenberg); 1846 (Fairchild)
- Founder: William Augustus Muhlenberg
- Closed: 1848 (Muhlenberg); 1903 (Fairchild)
- Gender: Boys

Flushing Institute was an American independent boys' college-preparatory school located in Flushing, New York.

== History ==
In 1826, Rev. Dr. William Augustus Muhlenberg moved to Flushing, New York, and founded an all-boys school while serving as rector of St. George's Church.

Muhlenberg's initial proposal included the name The Christian Institute for the school, but stockholders submitted a bill naming it The Christian Institute of Flushing. Worried that the term "Christian" might hinder the bill's passage, officials changed the name to Flushing Institute with Rev. Mr. Muhlenberg's approval before presenting it to the New York State Legislature. In 1827, the institution was formally incorporated under the leadership of Rev. W. A. Muhlenberg as school principal.

On August 11, 1827, the cornerstone of the school was laid. Located in Flushing, New York, the institute was housed in a large 1828 Greek Revival building, east of Main Street and north of the New York, Flushing, and Northside Railroad.

By spring 1828, the institute was ready and opened its doors to pupils. Following the classical curriculum of the time, the Flushing Institute taught boys mathematics, natural history and philosophy (including English), Latin and Greek, or, for future merchants, French and Spanish instead.

Muhlenberg ran the Episcopal school like a large Christian family under a strictly paternalistic model. Though independent of the Diocese and Bishop, it soon became a leading example of Christian-based boys' education. The Flushing Institute adopted its core educational and moral principles from Philipp Emanuel von Fellenberg's respected institution in Bern, Switzerland. Bishop Levi Silliman Ives visited the Flushing Institute to study its methods for the Episcopal School in Raleigh, North Carolina.

The daily routine began at 5:50 a.m. with the waking bell, followed by roll call, chapel prayers, and breakfast. Mornings were spent on study and recitations, while the five afternoon hours alternated between recreation, study, and recitation. Evenings were reserved for reading and relaxation, with the day ending in chapel at 9:00 p.m. On Saturdays, the boys were free to amuse themselves in the afternoon. Sundays were devoted to religious activities, beginning at 6:00 a.m. with roll call, chapel, and breakfast. The morning continued with Scripture lessons and a question session in chapel, followed by Bible memorization and a 10:30 a.m. service and sermon. After lunch, the boys prepared sermon responses, recited Scripture at 2:00 p.m., and returned to chapel at 3:30 p.m. From 7:00 to 8:00 p.m., religious meetings were held in the chapel or instructors' rooms, with the day ending in prayer at 9:00 p.m.

The ringing of the school bell, housed in the cupola of the Institute at Main and Amity streets, called members to prayer and the dining room. The Flushing Institute's school bell was placed on exhibit at the Queens Museum in 1976.

The school's publication, Journal of the Institute at Flushing, began in the early 1830s.

In the mid-1830s, Dr. Muhlenberg aimed to expand his vision of Christian higher education by purchasing 175 acres at today's College Point. He planned a stone college costing $50,000, laying the cornerstone on October 15, 1836. However, the building never advanced beyond the foundation due to the Panic of 1837 and financial ruin of his backers. St. Paul's College and Grammar School, a wooden edifice, was built at College Point, the institute's students were moved there, ending its Flushing connection. The college prospered until 1844, before Dr. Muhlenberg moved to New York City to become rector of the Church of the Holy Communion.

Following the institute's move to College Point, the building in Flushing was occupied by a school for girls. The Flushing Institute was leased to Rev. Dr. John Frederick Schroeder who renamed it St. Ann's Hall.

=== Fairchild's Institute (1846-1903) ===
In 1845, Ezra Fairchild, who had run a boys' school in New Jersey since 1816, moved to Flushing and took over Dr. Schroeder's remaining lease of St. Ann's Hall. The property was later purchased, and the original name, Flushing Institute, was restored. When Ezra Fairchild's school moved to Flushing, his son Elias A. Fairchild was completing his senior year at Rutgers College. Following his 1845 graduation, he started as an assistant headmaster at the Institute under his father.

Known popularly as "Fairchild's Institute" due to the family's long tenure, the school gained international recognition under the Fairchilds. Advertisements in English, French, and Spanish drew hundreds of boys from South America, Mexico, Spain, France, Ireland, Austria, and throughout the United States, despite travel being difficult and costly during that era.

In 1851, Allen P. Northup, having graduated from Vermont's Middlebury College, relocated to Flushing and accepted a faculty role teaching mathematics and related subjects. Upon the death of Ezra Fairchild in 1854, his son, Elias A. Fairchild partnered with A. P. Northrop who was his brother-in-law. E. A. Fairchild and A. P. Northup operated the educational institution from 1856 until June 1902.

== Closure ==
The rise in public high schools rendered it unprofitable, leading to its suspension in the early 1900s. By 1903, Elias A. Fairchild, who had been headmaster since 1846, announced he was ready to retire, leading to the school's permanent closure.

Following its closure, the Flushing Institute served as a home for Elias A. Fairchild's family, with Mrs. Fairchild living in a section of the old house until it was torn down in the 1920s.

The Flushing Institute's alumni organized the first reunion ever held by the school in 1903. The Flushing Institute Association was organized in June 1908 by former students headed by Edward M. Frankling, superintendent of supplies at New York Life Insurance Company, to maintain the school's legacy. Its members consisted of alumni and former teachers.

The building of the Flushing Institute remained at its location for nearly a hundred years, between 1827 and 1925. Demolition of the building took place in 1925. The site of the Flushing Institute gave way in 1929 to the $1,800,000 Flushing Central Terminal Building.

== Principal ==
- William Augustus Muhlenberg
- Ezra Fairchild
- Elias A. Fairchild

== Notable alumni ==
Among the most prominent alumni are:

- Cornelius Vanderbilt – shipping magnate of the wealthy and influential Vanderbilt family
- Louis Comfort Tiffany – artist and designer of Tiffany & Co.
- Rev. Frederick Brewerton Carter – Archdeacon of the Newark Diocese and rector of St. Luke's Protestant Episcopal Church in Montclair, New Jersey
- Hon. L. Bradford Prince – fourteenth governor of New Mexico Territory
- Rev. George Roe Van De Water – chaplain of Columbia University
- Hon. De Lancey Nicoll – district attorney for New York County
- Rev. Theodore L. Cuyler, D. D. – minister and writer
- Rev. Henry Everston Cobb – minister of the Collegiate Reformed Protestant Dutch Church of the City of New York
- Rev. John Barrett Kerfoot – first Episcopal Bishop of Pittsburgh
- Col. Frederic Vaughan Abbot – military officer
- Carll S. Burr Jr. – member of the New York State Senate
- Marston T. Bogert – chemist
- William Henry Odenheimer – third Episcopal Bishop of New Jersey
- Spencer S. Wood - rear admiral of United States Navy
- Libertus Van Bokkelen – first superintendent of the Maryland State Department of Education
- Joseph Fitch - member of New York State Assembly
- James Lloyd Breck - missionary of the Episcopal Church in the United States of America

== See also ==
- Flushing, New York
