= Ralph E. Urban =

American bishop (1875–1935)

The Right Reverend Ralph E. Urban D.D., S.T.D.
- Suffragan Bishop of New Jersey
- Church: Episcopal Church
- Diocese: New Jersey
- Elected: June 15, 1932
- In office: 1932–1935

Orders
- Ordination: May 23, 1900 by John Scarborough
- Consecration: November 11, 1932 by James De Wolf Perry

Personal details
- Born: March 29, 1875 Mount Hope, Pennsylvania, United States
- Died: May 19, 1935 (aged 60) Philadelphia, Pennsylvania, United States
- Denomination: Anglican
- Parents: Abram Linwood Urban & Emma Louisa Trexter
- Spouse: Mary Elizabeth Gunsaules (m. 1901)
- Education: Princeton University

Ralph Ernest Urban (March 29, 1875 – May 19, 1935) was suffragan bishop of the Episcopal Diocese of New Jersey.

== Biography ==
He was born in Mount Hope, Lancaster County, Pennsylvania. After studies at Princeton University and the General Theological Seminary, he was made deacon in 1899 and ordained priest in 1900. He was rector of All Saints Church, Trenton, New Jersey from 1900 to 1931. He then became the first Dean of Trinity Cathedral and was also elected suffragan bishop of New Jersey on June 15, 1932, and consecrated on November 11, 1932.
