= George Councell =

American bishop (1949–2018)

The Right Reverend George Edward Councell M.Div.
- Bishop of New Jersey
- Church: Episcopal Church
- Diocese: New Jersey
- Elected: May 3, 2003
- In office: 2003–2013
- Predecessor: Joe Morris Doss
- Successor: William H. Stokes

Orders
- Ordination: 1975 by Robert C. Rusack
- Consecration: October 18, 2003 by Frank Griswold

Personal details
- Born: October 4, 1949 Detroit, Michigan, United States
- Died: May 21, 2018 (aged 68) Hamilton, New Jersey, United States
- Denomination: Anglican
- Spouse: Ruth May Tietjen
- Children: 2

George Edward Councell (October 4, 1949 – May 21, 2018) was the 11th bishop of the Episcopal Diocese of New Jersey and the 990th in succession in the Episcopal Church.

== Biography ==
George Edward Councell was born in Detroit and baptized in St. John's Episcopal Church in Royal Oak, Michigan in 1949. He was raised in Whittier, California where he attended public schools. He was elected bishop on May 3, 2003, and consecrated on October 18, 2003, at Trinity Cathedral in Trenton. Officially, Councell followed Joe Morris Doss as Bishop of New Jersey after Doss was forced to resign amidst controversy. David B. Joslin (retired Bishop of Central New York) served as assisting bishop while the diocese organized to elect its 11th bishop (i.e. Councell).

Before his election, Councell spent eight years serving as the rector of the Church of the Holy Spirit in Lake Forest, Illinois. From 1986 to 1995 Councell served as canon to the ordinary in the Episcopal Diocese of Western Massachusetts following eight years as vicar at St. George's Church in Riverside, California.

Councell also served on the Standing Committee of the Episcopal Diocese of Chicago (2002-2003), as a trustee to Seabury-Western Theological Seminary, President of the board of Episcopal Charities and Community Services in the Episcopal Diocese of Chicago (1996-2002), Deputy and Chair of deputation to General Convention in the Episcopal Diocese of Western Massachusetts (1991, 1994), Secretary of Convention, Episcopal Diocese of Western Massachusetts (1988-1993), a member of Executive Committee of the Alumni/Alumnae Association, Episcopal Divinity School (1988-1992), chair of the Committee for the Future, chaplain and member of the Board of Directors Riverside Hospice, Episcopal Diocese of Los Angeles (1982-1984).

Councell graduated from the University of California at Riverside Phi Beta Kappa with honors with a Bachelor of Arts in 1971. In 1975 he earned a Master of Divinity, from Episcopal Divinity School in Cambridge, Massachusetts. Councell was ordained a priest in 1975 in the Episcopal Diocese of Los Angeles.

Councell lived in Pennington, New Jersey with his wife, Ruth May Tietjen, an artist and illustrator. They have two grown children: Sarah Councell Turner who graduated from Virginia Theological Seminary with a Master of Theological Studies degree and now working for Bread for the World in Washington, D.C., and Martha Councell, a professional flutist.

Councell retired from his position as bishop in 2013. His successor, the Right Rev. William (Chip) Stokes, was consecrated in November 2013. From January 2014 until his death, Councell served as resident Chaplain of Doane Academy, an Episcopal college preparatory school in Burlington, New Jersey. He taught courses on Ethics and World Religions.
