= William H. Stokes =

12th Bishop of New Jersey

The Right Reverend William H. Stokes
- Church: Episcopal Church
- Diocese: New Jersey
- Elected: May 4, 2013
- In office: 2013–2023
- Predecessor: George Councell
- Successor: Sally French

Orders
- Ordination: April 27, 1991
- Consecration: November 2, 2013 by Katharine Jefferts Schori

Personal details
- Born: February 18, 1957 (age 69) Manhasset, New York, United States
- Denomination: Anglican
- Spouse: Susan
- Children: 4

William "Chip" Hallock Stokes (born February 18, 1957, in Manhasset, New York) is a retired American clergyman who served as the 12th Bishop of New Jersey, the 1079th individual consecrated to the episcopacy in succession in the Episcopal Church. He was succeeded as bishop by Sally French in 2023.

== Biography ==
He was elected on May 4, 2013, and consecrated November 2, 2013 at Trinity Cathedral in Trenton, New Jersey. Prior to consecraton, Bishop Stokes served as rector of St. Paul's Church, Delray Beach, Florida. He is an alumnus of Xavier High School, Manhattan College and the General Theological Seminary. He currently lives in St. Augustine, Florida with his wife, Susan. They have four grown children, and three grandchildren.

== See also ==
- List of Episcopal bishops of the United States
- Historical list of the Episcopal bishops of the United States
