= St. Mary's Episcopal Church =

St. Mary's Episcopal Church, or variants thereof, may refer to:

== Scotland ==
- St Mary's Episcopal Church, Dunblane

== United States ==
- St. Mary's Episcopal Church (Jasper, Alabama), in Jasper, Alabama
- St. Mary's Episcopal Church (Phoenix), Arizona
- St. Mary's Episcopal Church (Monticello, Arkansas), listed on the NRHP in Drew County, Arkansas
- St. Mary's Episcopal Church (Green Cove Springs, Florida), NRHP-listed in Clay County
- St. Mary's Episcopal Church (Madison, Florida), NRHP-listed
- St. Mary's Episcopal Church and Rectory (Milton, Florida), NRHP-listed
- St. Mary's Episcopal Church (Athens, Georgia)
- St. Mary's Episcopal Church (Emmett, Idaho), listed on the NRHP in Idaho
- St. Mary's Episcopal Church (Middlesboro, Kentucky), NRHP-listed
- St. Mary's Episcopal Church (Franklin, Louisiana), NRHP-listed
- St. Mary's Episcopal Church (Weyanoke, Louisiana), NRHP-listed
- St. Mary's Episcopal Church/Woodlawn, Woodlawn, Maryland, NRHP-listed
- St. Mary's Episcopal Church (Dorchester, Massachusetts), NRHP-listed
- St. Mary's Episcopal Church (Newton Lower Falls, Massachusetts)
- St. Mary's Episcopal Church (Fayette, Missouri), NRHP-listed
- St. Mary's Episcopal Church (Kansas City, Missouri), NRHP-listed
- St. Mary's Episcopal Church (Burlington, New Jersey), NRHP-listed
- Saint Mary's Episcopal Church, Briarcliff Manor, New York, contributing property of the Scarborough Historic District
- St. Mary's Episcopal Church (Brooklyn), NRHP-listed
- St. Mary's Episcopal Church (Springfield Center, New York)
- St. Mary's Episcopal Church (Asheville, North Carolina)
- St. Mary's Episcopal Church (West Jefferson, North Carolina)
- Saint Mary's Episcopal Church and Parish House, Hillsboro, Ohio, NRHP-listed
- Saint Mary's Church, Hamilton Village, Philadelphia, Pennsylvania
- St. Mary's Episcopal Church (Elverson, Pennsylvania), NRHP-listed
- St. Mary's Episcopal Church (East Providence, Rhode Island), NRHP-listed
- St. Mary's Episcopal Church (Portsmouth, Rhode Island), NRHP-listed
- St. Mary's Episcopal Church (Flandreau, South Dakota), NRHP-listed
- St. Mary's Episcopal Church (Washington, D.C.), NRHP-listed
- St. Mary's Episcopal Church (Provo, Utah)

== See also ==
- St. Mary's Church (disambiguation)
