= St. Peter's Episcopal Church (Perth Amboy, New Jersey) =

Historic church in New Jersey, United States

- U.S. National Register of Historic Places
- New Jersey Register of Historic Places
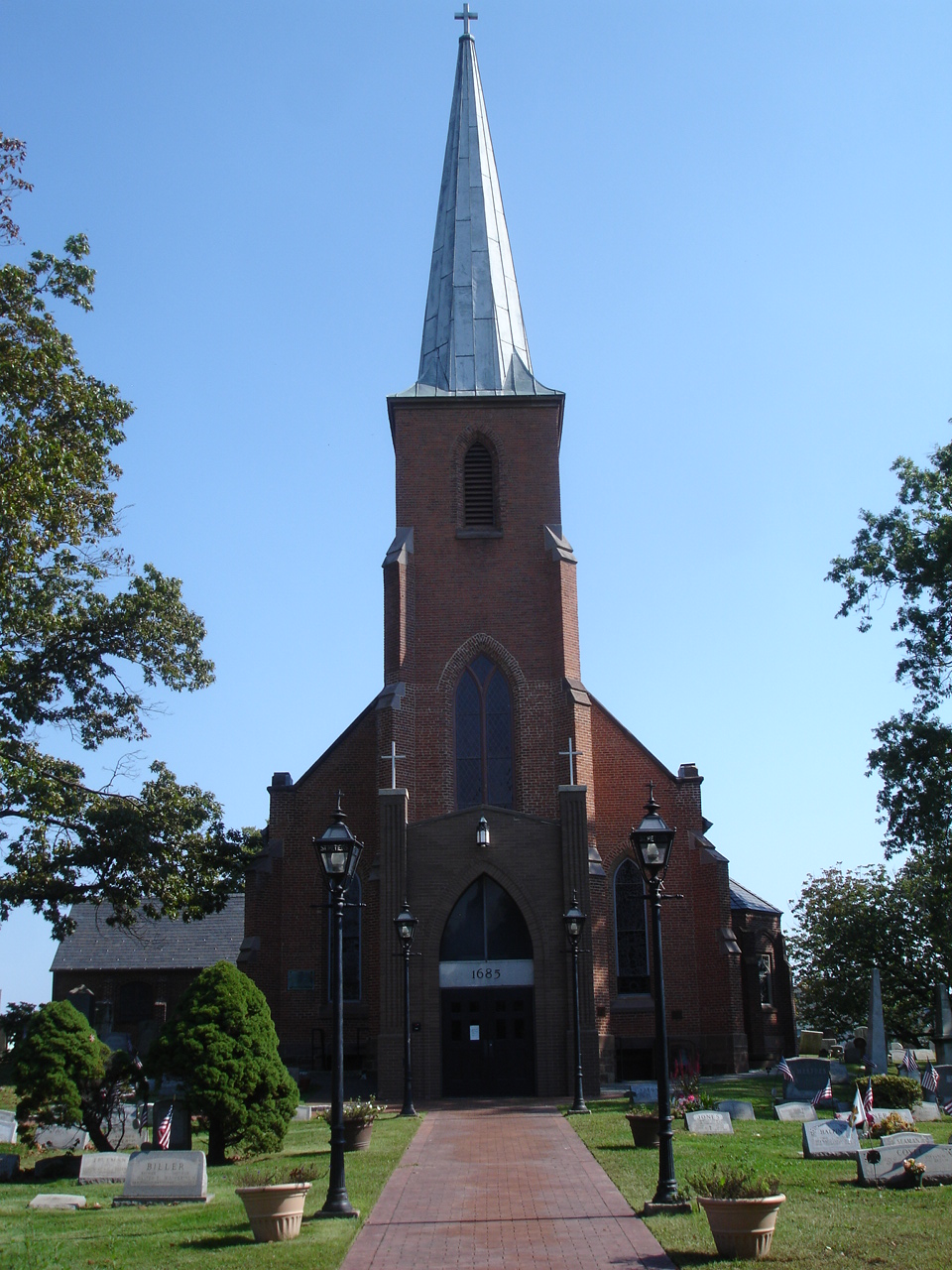

- Location within Middlesex County, New Jersey Location within New Jersey Location within the United States
- Location: Rector and Gordon Streets, Perth Amboy, New Jersey
- Coordinates: 40°30′13″N 74°15′55″W
- Area: 2.5 acres (1.0 ha)
- Built: 1849
- Architectural style: Gothic, Tudor Revival
- NRHP reference No.: 77000885
- NJRHP No.: 1902

Significant dates
- Added to NRHP: May 12, 1977
- Designated NJRHP: September 26, 1975

St. Peter's Episcopal Church is a historic church at Rector and Gordon Streets in Perth Amboy, Middlesex County, New Jersey. It is the oldest Episcopal parish in New Jersey and contains the oldest extant gravestone in New Jersey. The church building, built from 1849 to 1852 in Gothic style, was added to the National Register of Historic Places on May 12, 1977, for its significance in religion.

The church reported 482 members in 2015 and 263 members in 2023; no membership statistics were reported nationally in 2024 parochial reports. Plate and pledge income reported for the congregation in 2024 was $153,343. Average Sunday attendance (ASA) in 2023 was 46 persons, down from a reported 127 in 2016. It is a parish of the Episcopal Diocese of New Jersey.

== History ==
The congregation was organized in 1680 when 12 Church of England communicants designated themselves the Congregation of St. Peter's Episcopal Church. They erected a church using the foundation of an abandoned courthouse. That site is not far from the current church. In 1706, Anne, Queen of Great Britain presented the parish with a set of communion silver that is still extant. The congregation received a royal charter in 1718 from George I of Great Britain. The second building on the site was built in 1722 and was destroyed by a fire.

In 1770 Governor William Franklin was a vestryman in the congregation.

During the American Revolution colonial soldiers built a redoubt behind the church to defend town against attacks from the British and Loyalist troops across the Arthur Kill in Staten Island.

The first black man to vote in America, Thomas Mundy Peterson, was a member of the church and was buried in the church graveyard. He voted in the Perth Amboy, New Jersey mayoral election on March 31, 1870. That was one day after adoption of the Fifteenth Amendment to the United States Constitution.

== Graveyard ==
Helen Gordon (1660-1687) was the wife of Thomas Gordon of Scotland; she died December 12, 1687, aged 27 years. Her tombstone is the oldest still erected in New Jersey. Her tombstone reads: "Calm was her death, well ordered her life, a pious mother and a loving wife, her offspring six, of which 4 here do lie, their souls in heaven, wher's do rest on high". In 1875 her tombstone and remains were moved from a cemetery on State Street to Saint Peter's Episcopal Church Cemetery.

== Rectors ==
- The Rev. Edward Portlock (1698)
- The Rev. John Brook (1704–1707)
- The Rev. Edward Vaughn (1709–1711, 1714–1722)
- The Rev. William Halliday (1711–1713)
- The Rev. William Skinner (1722–1758), brother of Cortlandt Skinner
- The Rev. Solomon Palmer (Served 1760-1762, but not named as Rector)
- The Rev. Robert McKean (1763–1767)
- The Rev. John Preston (1769–1777)
- The Rev. Abraham Beach (1782–1784)
- The Rev. John Hamilton Rowland (1784–1787)
- The Rev. George Hartwell Spieren (1788–1790)
- The Rev. Henry Van Dyke (1791–1793)
- The Rev. Richard Channing Moore (1793–1803)
- The Rev. Jasper Davis Jones (1804–1809)
- The Rev. James Chapman (1809–1844)
- The Rev. James Hamble Leacock (1845–1848)
- The Rev. Horace Edgar Pratt (1849–1854)
- The Rev. Dr. Alexander Jones {II}(1855–1871)
- The Rev. Albert Rhett Walker (1871–1877)
- The Rev. James Orlando Drumm (1877–1878)
- The Rev. Everard Patterson Miller (1879–1892)
- The Rev. James Leach Lancaster (1893–1914)
- The Rev. William Northey Jones {(1914–1934)}
- The Rev. Canon George Hogan Boyd (1935–1976), Descendant of The Right Rev. John Croes, 1st Bishop of New Jersey
- The Rev. J. Rodney Croes (1977–2008)
- The Rev. Dr. Anne-Marie Jeffery (2011–2020)
- The Very Rev. Dr. Fabian Villalobos (2025–present)

== Gallery ==
The tombstone of Helen Gordon (1660–1687) was moved to the church in 1875 and is the oldest gravestone in New Jersey

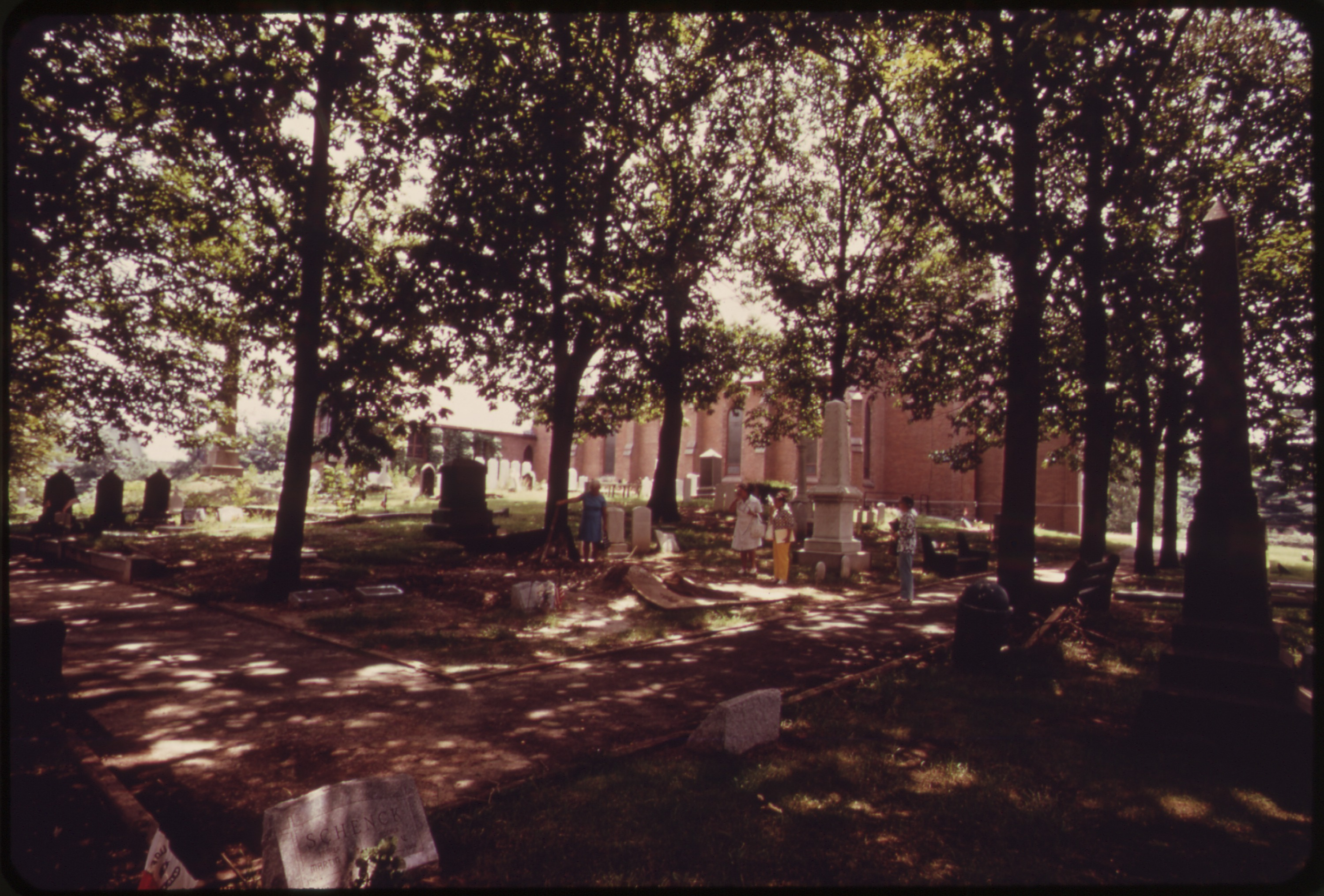
Church and graveyard

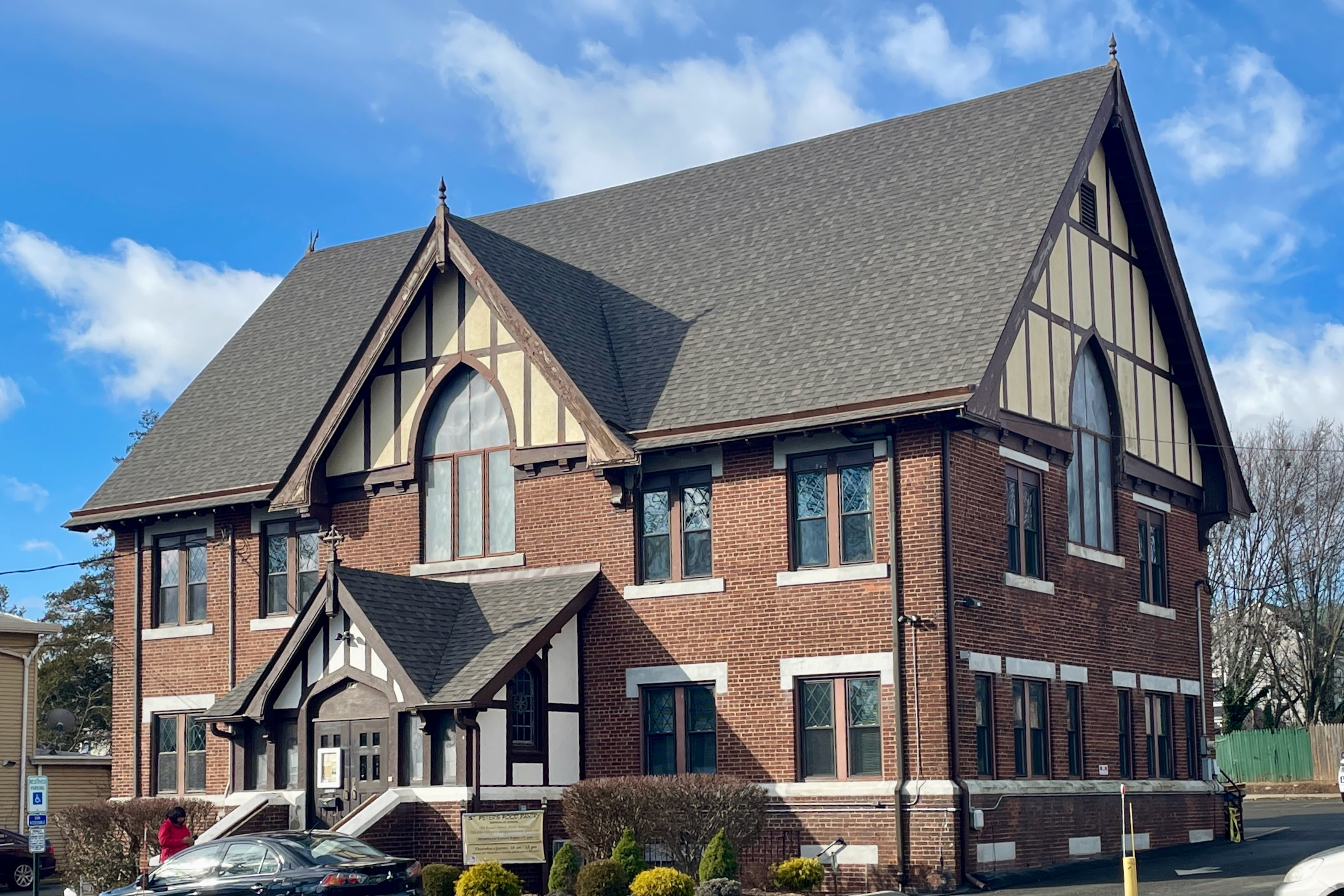
Parish House, built in 1909
