= Albert W. Van Duzer =

American bishop (born 1917)

The Right Reverend Albert W. Van Duzer D.D., S.T.D.
- Bishop of New Jersey
- Church: Episcopal Church
- Diocese: New Jersey
- In office: 1973–1982
- Predecessor: Alfred L. Banyard
- Successor: G. P. Mellick Belshaw
- Previous posts: Suffragan Bishop of New Jersey (1966-1972); Coadjutor Bishop of New Jersey (1972-1973)

Orders
- Ordination: May 1946 by Wallace John Gardner
- Consecration: January 24, 1966 by John E. Hines

Personal details
- Born: July 15, 1917 Newburgh, New York, U.S.
- Died: November 27, 1999 (aged 82) Moorestown, New Jersey, U.S.
- Buried: Saint Andrew's Graveyard Mount Holly, New Jersey
- Denomination: Anglican
- Parents: Albert Barton Van Duzer & Clara Helen Wiencke
- Spouse: Marion Reba Lippincott
- Children: 3

Albert Wiencke Van Duzer (July 15, 1917 – November 27, 1999) was bishop of the Episcopal Diocese of New Jersey, serving from 1973 to 1982.

== Biography ==
Van Duzer was born in Newburgh, New York, the son of Albert Barton Van Duzer and Clara Helen Wiencke. He was raised in Toms River, New Jersey, where he attended Toms River High School (now known as Toms River High School South) as part of the class of 1935 and St. Bernard's School (since merged into Gill St. Bernard's School) in Gladstone, New Jersey. He graduated with a Bachelor of Arts from Trinity College in 1940 and a Bachelor of Theology from General Theological Seminary in 1945. He was awarded the Doctor of Sacred Theology from General Theological Seminary in 1966 and an honorary Doctor of Divinity degree from Philadelphia Divinity School in 1967.

Van Duzer was ordained deacon in November 1945 and priest in May 1946 after which he became curate of Grace Church in Merchantville, New Jersey. In 1947 he transferred to Cape May, New Jersey, to serve as rector of the Church of Advent. In 1949 he went back to Grace Church and became rector where he remained till 1966. On May 6, 1958, he was installed as an honorary canon of Trinity Cathedral.

On September 18, 1965, he was elected Suffragan Bishop of New Jersey on the fifth ballot at a special convention that was held in Trinity Cathedral. He was consecrated on January 24, 1966, in Trinity Cathedral by Presiding Bishop John E. Hines. He was elected Coadjutor Bishop of New Jersey on September 18, 1972, and succeeded as diocesan bishop in 1973. He retired in 1982. Over the course of his career, Van Duzer lived in Medford, Merchantville, Moorestown, and Trenton.
