= George Washington Doane =

American bishop (1799–1859)

The Right Reverend George Washington Doane
- Bishop of New Jersey
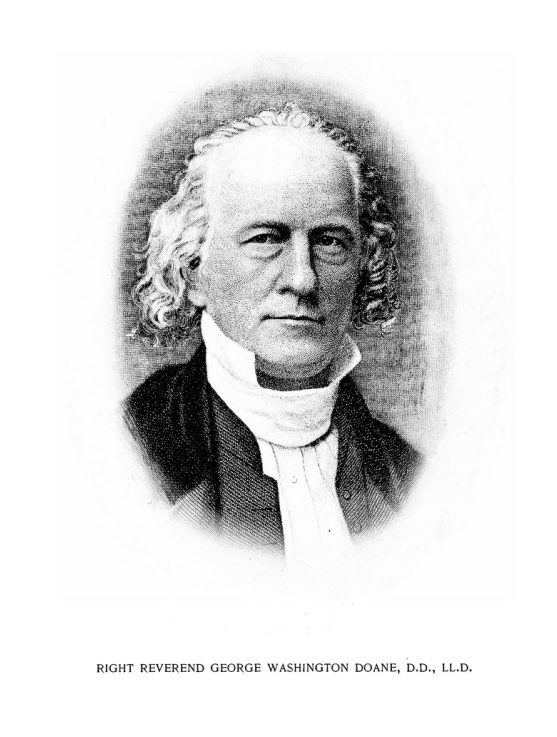
- Church: Episcopal Church
- Diocese: New Jersey
- Elected: October 3, 1832
- In office: 1832–1859
- Predecessor: John Croes
- Successor: William Henry Odenheimer
- Previous posts: Rector, Trinity Church, Boston

Orders
- Ordination: August 6, 1823 by John Henry Hobart
- Consecration: October 31, 1832 by William White

Personal details
- Born: May 27, 1799 Trenton, New Jersey, United States
- Died: April 27, 1859 (aged 59) Burlington, New Jersey, US
- Buried: St. Mary's Episcopal Church, Burlington, New Jersey
- Denomination: Anglican
- Spouse: Eliza Greene Callahan Perkins Doane
- Signature: George Washington Doane's signature

George Washington Doane (May 27, 1799 – April 27, 1859) was an American churchman, educator, and the second bishop in the Episcopal Church for the Diocese of New Jersey.

== Early life and career ==
Doane was born in Trenton, New Jersey. He graduated from Union College, Schenectady, New York, in 1818. He did additional studies in theology and, in 1821, was ordained deacon. In 1823 he was ordained as an Episcopal priest by Bishop Hobart, whom he assisted in Trinity Church, New York.

With George Upfold (1796–1872), Bishop of Indiana from 1849 to 1872, Doane founded St. Luke's Church in New York City. From 1824 to 1828 he was professor of belles-lettres in Washington (now Trinity) College, Hartford, Connecticut. At this time, he was one of the editors of the Episcopal Watchman. He was assistant in 1828–1830 and rector in 1830–1832 of Trinity Church, Boston.

== Bishop of New Jersey ==
Doane was called as second bishop of New Jersey, serving from October 1832 to his death in 1859 at Burlington, New Jersey. In 1837, he founded St. Mary's Hall (now Doane Academy), to provide a classical education for girls. It was the first such boarding school for girls in the United States, in a period when numerous schools for girls were founded.

The school was supported in part by a gift from his wife, Eliza Greene Callahan (married firstly James Perkins; second George Washington Doane). In 1846 he founded Burlington College, a school for boys. These fulfilled his theory of education under church control. Because of national financial crises, his business management of these schools got the diocese heavily into debt. In the autumn of 1852, a charge of lax administration was made against him before a court of bishops, who dismissed it.

Doane was shown to be an able and wise disciplinarian of these schools. His patriotic orations and sermons prove him a speaker of great power. He belonged to the High Church party and was a brilliant controversialist. He published Songs by the Way (1824), a volume of poems. He also wrote hymns, of which those beginning "Softly now the light of day" and "Thou art the Way" are well known.

He commissioned John Notman to build a chapel for St. Mary's Hall. The congregation of St. Mary's Church grew, and he commissioned architect Richard Upjohn to design a new St. Mary's Church, his episcopal seat, completed in 1856. Both buildings have been recognized as National Historic Landmarks.

== Death ==
Doane died in 1859. He was buried in Saint Mary's Episcopal Churchyard in Burlington.

== Legacy ==
Among those whom Doane had ordained during his lifetime was Joseph Wolff, a Jewish Christian missionary.

Doane's biography and bibliography, Life and Writings of George Washington Doane (4 vols, New York, 1860–1861), was edited by his son, William Croswell Doane (1832–1913). He followed his father into the clergy and was called as the first Bishop of Albany. That both Doane and his son became "bishops [was] a situation possibly not unique but certainly rare enough to be remarked upon."

Founded in 1837 and now known as Doane Academy, the private school he founded is coeducational, serving grades Pre-K through 12, and has a substantial endowment to ensure its future. It was the first academic, church run school for girls in the United States.

== See also ==
- Historical list of bishops of the Episcopal Church in the United States of America

== Sources ==
- The Episcopal Church Annual. Morehouse Publishing: New York (2005).
- Bishops of the Diocese of New Jersey
- Doane, George Washington, Bishop of New Jersey, The apostolical commission the missionary charter of the church. The Sermon [on Matt. xxviii. 18–20] at the ordination of Joseph Wolff in ... Newark, Sept. 26, 1837.
