= St. George's-by-the-River Episcopal Church =

Historic church in New Jersey, United States

- U.S. National Register of Historic Places
- New Jersey Register of Historic Places
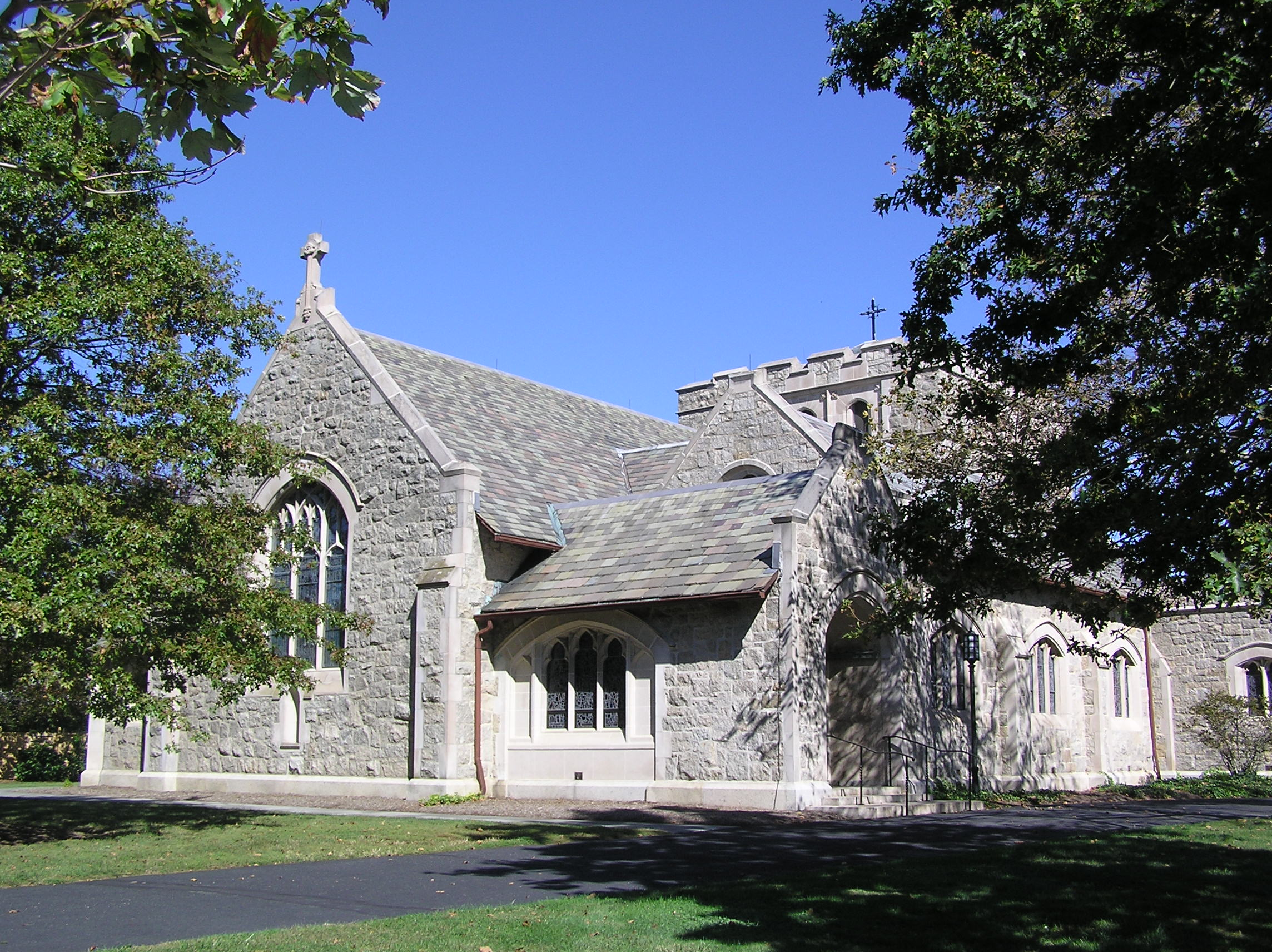

- Location within Monmouth County, New Jersey Location within New Jersey Location within the United States
- Location: 7 Lincoln Avenue, Rumson, New Jersey
- Coordinates: 40°21′48″N 73°58′43″W
- Area: 1.3 acres (0.53 ha)
- Built: 1907
- Architect: Walker & Gillette; Swallow's & Howes
- Architectural style: Late Gothic Revival
- NRHP reference No.: 07000045
- NJRHP No.: 4264

Significant dates
- Added to NRHP: February 13, 2007
- Designated NJRHP: December 21, 2006

St. George's-by-the-River Episcopal Church is a historic church at 7 Lincoln Avenue in Rumson, Monmouth County, New Jersey, United States. It is a parish of the Episcopal Diocese of New Jersey. The church reported 1,132 members in 2015 and 1,179 members in 2023; no membership statistics were reported in 2024 parochial reports. Plate and pledge income reported for the congregation in 2024 was $641,266 with average Sunday attendance (ASA) of 144 persons.

The church was built in 1907 and added to the National Register in 2007. Its tower contains a carillon of 26 bells, cast by John Taylor & Co in 1934 and 2001.

== Notable clergy ==
- John Andrew; curate from 1959 to 1960, later Rector of Saint Thomas Church, New York
- G. P. Mellick Belshaw; rector from 1963 to 1973, later ninth Bishop of the Diocese of New Jersey.
