= John Andrew (priest, born 1931) =

The Reverend Canon John Andrew OBE
- Rector of St. Thomas' Church
- Church: The Episcopal Church
- Province: Province II
- Diocese: Diocese of New York
- In office: 1972–1996
- Other post: Chaplain to the Archbishop of Canterbury (1961-1969)

Orders
- Ordination: 1956 (deacon); 1957 (priest) by Michael Ramsey

Personal details
- Born: John Gerald Barton Andrew; 10 January 1931 Scarborough, Yorkshire, England
- Died: 17 October 2014 (aged 83) New York City, New York, United States
- Denomination: Anglicanism
- Education: Beverley Grammar School
- Alma mater: Keble College, Oxford; Cuddesdon College

John Gerald Barton Andrew, OBE (10 January 1931 – 17 October 2014) was a British Anglican priest. From 1972 to 1996, he was the Rector of St. Thomas' Church on New York's Fifth Avenue.

== Early life ==
Andrew was born on 10 January 1931 in Scarborough, Yorkshire, England. As a boy, he was a chorister at St Peters Church, Anlaby. He was educated at Beverley Grammar School, an all-boys school in Beverley, Yorkshire.

Having served in the Royal Air Force for 18 months as part of National Service, he was awarded a scholarship to the University of Oxford. He studied theology at Keble College, Oxford. He entered Cuddesdon College, an Anglican theological college in the Catholic tradition, in 1954 to train for ordination to the priesthood. He graduated from Keble College with a Bachelor of Arts (BA) degree in 1955; as per tradition, this was promoted to a Master of Arts (MA Oxon) degree in 1958. He then completed a further year of study at Cuddesdon before his ordination.

== Military service ==
On 9 March 1950, having completed officer training, Andrew was commissioned into the Secretarial Branch of the Royal Air Force as a pilot officer (national service). On 18 September 1951, after 18 months with the RAF, he was transferred to the reserve (national Service list) thereby ending his full-time service. He was promoted to flying officer on 4 June 1952. On 27 May 1956, he relinquished his commission and therefore ended his call-up liability.

== Ordained ministry ==
In 1956, Andrew was ordained in the Church of England as a deacon by Michael Ramsey, then the Archbishop of York, at York Minster. He was ordained as a priest in 1957. From 1956 to 1959, he served his curacy at St Peter's Church, Redcar. In 1959, he moved to the United States for the first time and was curate at St. George's-by-the-River, Rumson, New Jersey for approximately 18 months.

In October 1960, Andrew returned to England and was appointed chaplain to Michael Ramsey, then the Archbishop of York. From 1961 to 1969, he continued to serve as chaplain to Ramsey, now the Archbishop of Canterbury. His time as chaplain to Ramsey was controversial given his unusually young age (he was 30 when Ramsey became Archbishop of Canterbury) and because he had only ever been a curate (a junior parish priest). He was promoted to Senior Chaplain in 1965.

Andrew then moved back into parish ministry and from 1969 to 1972 served as Vicar of Church of St John the Evangelist, Preston, Lancashire. This appointment did not suit him; it was much less prestigious than that of chaplain to an archbishop and could be seen as a demotion. From 1970 to 1972, he was additionally Rural Dean of Preston, giving him a supervising role over 39 other priests. After three years, he sought a more prestigious appointment and made use of the influential contacts he had gained during his time as archbishop's chaplain.

In March 1972, the vestry of St Thomas' Church, New York City, United States, choose Andrew as their next rector. He had been recommended by a group of wealthy American women who formed part of the influential network he had built up. On 3 December 1972, he was instituted as the 11th Rector by Paul Moore, Jr., the Bishop of New York. His first act was to change the main Sunday service from Morning Prayer to a Eucharist and he extended this to daily Mass throughout the year. He also introduced incense to services, icons and Reservation of the Blessed Sacrament. There were attempts to lure him back to England with the offer of the appointment of Vicar of Tewkesbury Abbey, but he turned it down. On 29 January 1995, he was made an honorary canon of the Cathedral of St John the Divine, New York, by Richard F. Grein, Bishop of New York.

Andrew retired in 1996 and returned for a time to England. He later returned to New York and was appointed Rector Emeritus of St Thomas' Church in 1999.

== Later life ==
On 15 October 2014, Andrew was having dinner with John O'Hara, the newly appointed Roman Catholic Auxiliary Bishop of New York, when he had a heart attack. He was taken to the New York Presbyterian Hospital but died on 17 October. His funeral was held at St. Thomas' Church, New York, on 5 November.

== Honours ==
In the 1996 New Year Honours, Andrew was appointed an Officer of the Order of the British Empire (OBE) 'for charitable and community services in New York'. In May 1996, he was awarded the Cross of St Augustine, the second highest honour for service to Anglicanism, by George Carey, the then Archbishop of Canterbury.

He was awarded a number of honorary Doctor of Divinity (DD) degrees. In 1976, he was awarded DDs by Cuttington University, Liberia, and by the Episcopal Theological Seminary, Kentucky, US. In 1977, he was awarded a DD by Nashotah House Theological Seminary, Wisconsin, US. In 1996, he was awarded a DD by the General Theological Seminary, New York, US.

== Writings ==
- Nothing Cheap and Much That Is Cheerful (1988); ISBN 9780802836465
- The Best of Both Worlds (1991), Eerdmans; ISBN 0-8028-3689-5
