= G. P. Mellick Belshaw =

Bishop of the Episcopal Diocese of New Jersey (1928–2020)

The Right Reverend George Phelps Mellick Belshaw D.D.
- Bishop of New Jersey
- Church: Episcopal Church
- Diocese: New Jersey
- In office: 1983–1994
- Predecessor: Albert W. Van Duzer
- Successor: Joe Morris Doss
- Previous posts: Suffragan Bishop of New Jersey (1975-1982); Coadjutor Bishop of New Jersey (1982-1983)

Orders
- Ordination: December 1954 by Harry S. Kennedy
- Consecration: February 3, 1975 by John Allin

Personal details
- Born: July 14, 1928 Plainfield, New Jersey, United States
- Died: February 29, 2020 (aged 91) Princeton, New Jersey, United States
- Denomination: Anglican
- Parents: Harold Belshaw & Edith Mellick
- Spouse: Elizabeth Wheeler (m. June 12, 1954)
- Children: 3

George Phelps Mellick Belshaw (July 14, 1928—February 29, 2020) was the ninth bishop of the Episcopal Diocese of New Jersey, serving from 1983 to 1994.

== Education and professional life ==
Mellick Belshaw was born on July 14, 1928, in Plainfield, New Jersey, the son of Harold Belshaw and Edith Mellick. He married Elizabeth Wheeler in June 1954; they had three children. He earned his undergraduate degree at Sewanee in 1951, and his Master of Sacred Theology degree at General Theological Seminary in 1959. After his graduation from Sewanee he was ordained deacon in July 1954 and priest in December 1954. He became the fourth Vicar of St Matthew's Church in Waimanalo, Hawaii. After three years he became a fellow of the General Theological Seminary, New York City; he followed that with appointments as Rector of Christ Church (Dover, Delaware) and St. George's-by-the-River Episcopal Church in Rumson, New Jersey.

He was then consecrated Suffragan Bishop of the Diocese on February 3, 1975, and was elected Bishop Coadjutor on April 24, 1982. He assumed the title of Bishop of the Diocese of New Jersey upon the retirement of Albert W. Van Duzer in 1983 and served for 11 years. He was succeeded by Joe Morris Doss.

Belshaw died at home in Princeton, New Jersey on the morning of February 29, 2020.
