= Joe Morris Doss =

American bishop (born 1943)

The Right Reverend Joe Morris Doss J.D., D.D.
- Bishop of New Jersey
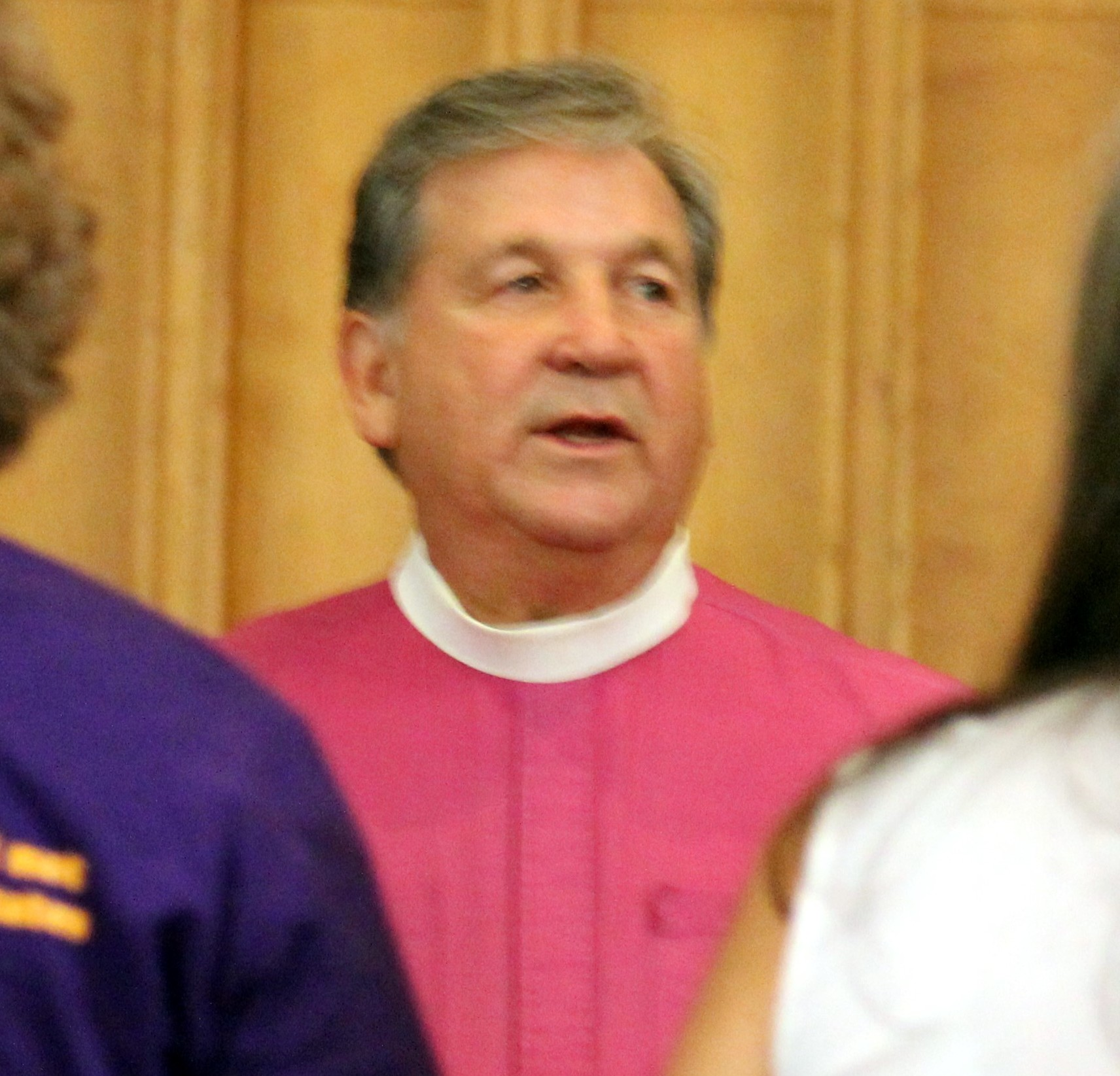
- Bishop Doss in 2015
- Church: Episcopal Church
- Diocese: New Jersey
- Elected: June 18, 1993 (Coadjutor)
- In office: 1995–2001
- Predecessor: G. P. Mellick Belshaw
- Successor: George Councell
- Previous post: Coadjutor Bishop of New Jersey (1993-1995)

Orders
- Ordination: 1972
- Consecration: October 31, 1993 by Edmond L. Browning

Personal details
- Born: March 29, 1943 (age 83) Mobile, Alabama, United States
- Denomination: Anglican
- Spouse: Susan Doss
- Children: 2
- Education: Louisiana State University; General Theological Seminary

Joe Morris Doss (born March 29, 1943) served as the 10th bishop of the Episcopal Diocese of New Jersey from 1995 to 2001. He was elected bishop coadjutor in June 1993 and became bishop diocesan in 1995 following the retirement of G. P. Mellick Belshaw.

== Biography ==
Doss was born in Mobile, Alabama and graduated from Louisiana State University and General Theological Seminary; he also holds a J.D. from LSU. Prior to his election as bishop coadjutor, he was rector of St. Mark's Episcopal Church, Palo Alto, California since 1985, having held the same position at Grace Episcopal Church, New Orleans, Louisiana from 1973 to 1985 after being deacon-in-charge of the Episcopal Church of the Good Shepherd in Lake Charles, Louisiana.

Doss announced his resignation on March 12, 1999, with effect coming in place on September 30, 2001, after a tenure in which that diocese was led into the mainstream of the Episcopal Church, though not without conflict and controversy - much of which was aimed at Doss in personal accusations, none of which produced any evidence of wrongdoing. Doss wrote an award-winning play, Song of a Man Coming Through, together with his son, M. Andrew Doss, about a death row inmate he defended in 1984. In 1985, Doss was elected to the Common Cause National Governing Board. He holds a Juris Doctor degree from Louisiana State University.

Following his resignation, Doss moved with his wife to New Orleans, Louisiana.

== Bibliography ==
- Let the Bastards Go: From Cuba to Freedom on "God's Mercy" (Louisiana State University Press) ISBN 9780807128541
- The Songs of the Mothers: Promises for the Future Church (Church Publishing, 2002) ISBN 9780898693805
- "The Shape of Liturgy is the Shape of Mission" in Journal of Associated Parishes (Associated Parishes for Liturgy and Mission)
- "Baptism or Confirmation?" in Journal of Associated Parishes (Associated Parishes for Liturgy and Mission)
