= John Bertalot =

English organist (1931–2026)

John Bertalot (15 September 1931 – 21 February 2026) was an English organist, who served at Blackburn Cathedral in England and at Trinity Church in Princeton, New Jersey, in the United States.

== Early life and education ==
Bertalot was born in Maidstone, Kent, in 1931. His grandfather, Giacomo Augusto Bertalot (1865−1929), was an Italian coal merchant who settled in Wales.

Bertalot was inspired to study the organ during a visit to Canterbury Cathedral as a child. After studying at Shoreham Grammar School, he trained under Harold Darke at the Royal College of Music in London. He was subsequently an organ scholar at Lincoln College, Oxford (1953−1955), where he studied with Egon Wellesz, and Corpus Christi College, Cambridge (1955−1958), where his tutor was Boris Ord. During his time at Cambridge he was the accompanist for the Cambridge University Musical Society and played during a week-long tour by the American evangelist Billy Graham.

== Career and retirement ==
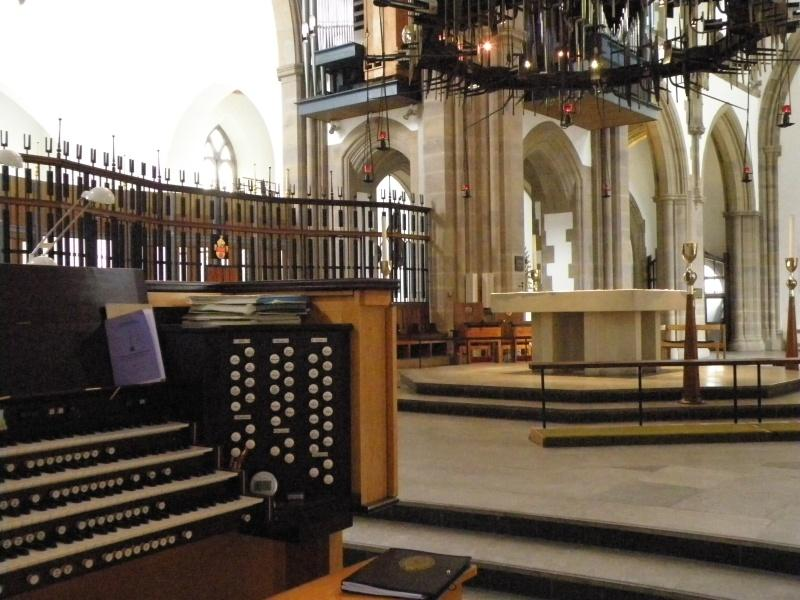
The organ of Blackburn Cathedral, where Bertalot was organist from 1964 to 1983.

Bertalot served as organist of St Matthew's Church, Northampton, from 1958 to 1964. During that time he also conducted local choirs and orchestras and taught at both Maidwell Hall and Northampton School for Girls.

In 1964 Bertalot became organist of Blackburn Cathedral in Lancashire, where he remained until 1983. He was credited with building the reputation of the cathedral choir and, with Francis Jackson, designing the cathedral's new organ in 1969. He also directed the Blackburn Bach Choir and taught at the Royal Northern College of Music.

After leaving Blackburn, Bertalot moved to the United States, where he was organist of Trinity Church, Princeton, in New Jersey from 1983 to 1998. He founded the Princeton Singers, who performed at the Three Choirs Festival in 1994, and taught at both Westminster Choir College and Rider University.

Returning to Lancashire in 1998, he was appointed Assistant Regional Director of the Royal School of Church Music and spent 11 years as the organist of his village church.

He died on 21 February 2026, at the age of 94. His funeral was held at Blackburn Cathedral on 14 March 2026.

== Works ==
Bertalot was known for his practical approach to teaching, and published several guides to choir directing and sight-singing:

- Five Wheels to Successful Sight-Singing (1993)
- John Bertalot's Immediately Practical Tips for Choral Directors (1994)
- How to be a Successful Choir Director (2002)

Cultural offices
Preceded by Thomas Lucas Duerden	Organist of Blackburn Cathedral; 1964–1983	Succeeded by David Anthony Cooper
Preceded by James Litton	Organist of Trinity Church, Princeton; 1983–1998	Succeeded by Andrew Shenton
