= John Scarborough =

Irish-American bishop

The Right Reverend John Scarborough D.D., LL.D.
- Bishop of New Jersey
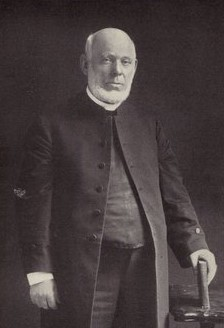
- Church: Episcopal Church
- Diocese: New Jersey
- Elected: November 12, 1874
- In office: 1875–1914
- Predecessor: William Henry Odenheimer
- Successor: Paul Matthews

Orders
- Ordination: August 14, 1858 by Horatio Potter
- Consecration: February 2, 1875 by Horatio Potter

Personal details
- Born: April 21, 1831 Castlewellan County Down, Ireland
- Died: March 14, 1914 (aged 82) Trenton, New Jersey, United States
- Buried: Riverview Cemetery (Trenton, New Jersey)
- Denomination: Anglican
- Spouse: Catherine Elizabeth Trivett
- Children: 5

John Scarborough (April 21, 1831 – March 14, 1914) was bishop of the Episcopal Diocese of New Jersey from 1875 to 1914.

== Biography ==
Scarborough was born on April 21, 1831, in Castlewellan County Down in Ireland. He and his family emigrated to the United States when he was a child and received his early education at Queensbury, New York. he graduated from Trinity College in Hartford in 1854 after which he attended the General Theological Seminary in New York. He was ordained deacon in Trinity Church on June 28, 1857, by Bishop Horatio Potter. He became assistant in St Paul Church in Troy, New York, where he was ordained priest on August 14, 1858. In 1861 he became rector of the Church of the Holy Comforter in Poughkeepsie, New York, and in 1867 was made rector of Trinity Church in Pittsburgh. He was consecrated as Bishop of New Jersey at St. Mary's Church, Burlington, on February 2, 1875. He died of pleuro-pneumonia on March 14, 1914.
