= John Croes =

American bishop (1762–1832)

The Right Reverend John Croes
- Bishop of New Jersey
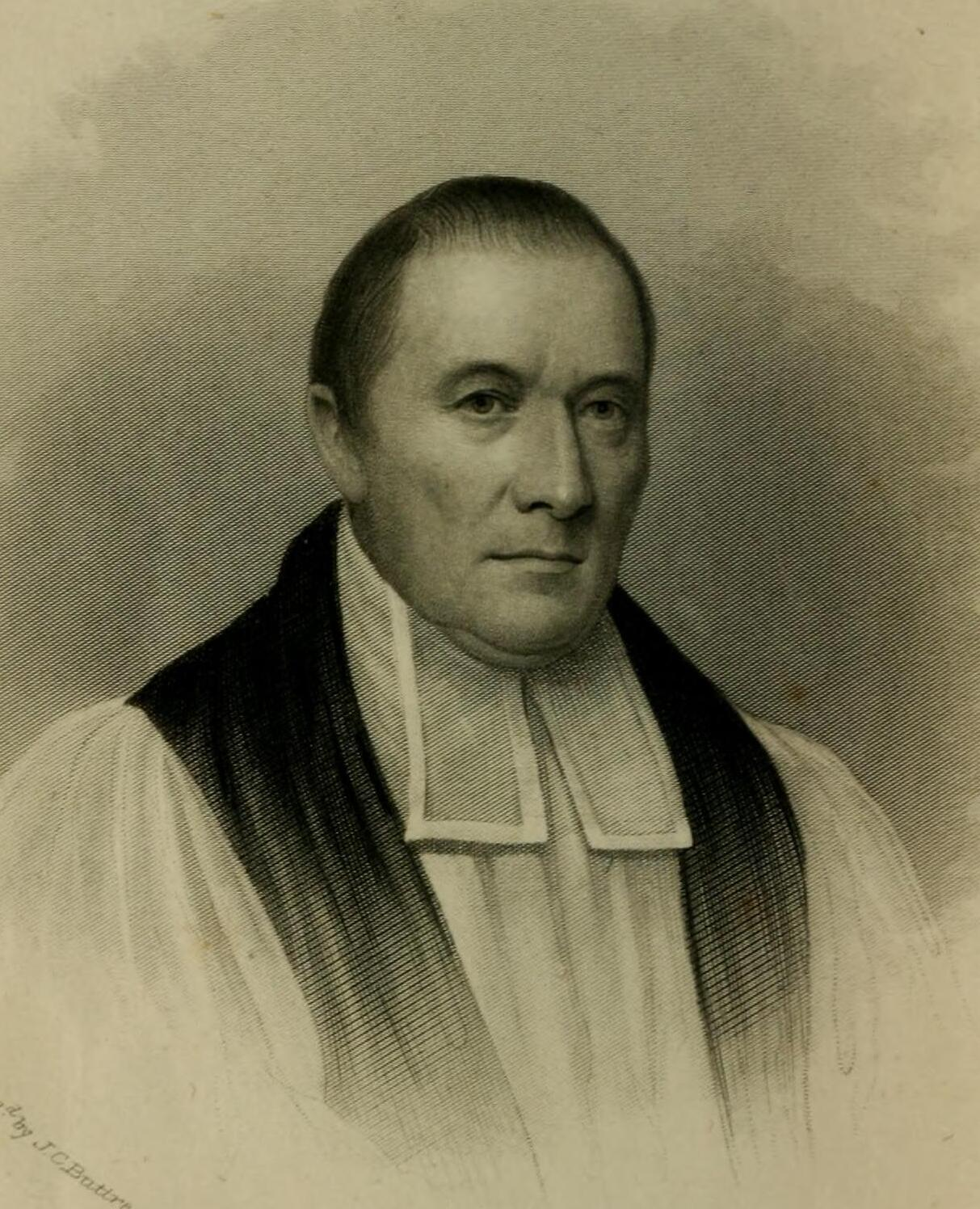
- The Rt. Rev. John Croes
- Church: Episcopal Church
- Diocese: New Jersey
- Elected: August 30, 1815
- In office: 1815–1832
- Successor: George Washington Doane

Orders
- Ordination: March 4, 1792 by William White
- Consecration: November 19, 1815 by William White

Personal details
- Born: June 1, 1762 Elizabeth, New Jersey, U.S.
- Died: July 26, 1832 (aged 70) New Brunswick, New Jersey, U.S.
- Buried: Christ Church in New Brunswick, New Jersey, U.S.
- Denomination: Anglican
- Parents: Jacob Croes and Charlotte Christiana Feigart
- Spouse: Martha Crane
- Children: 8
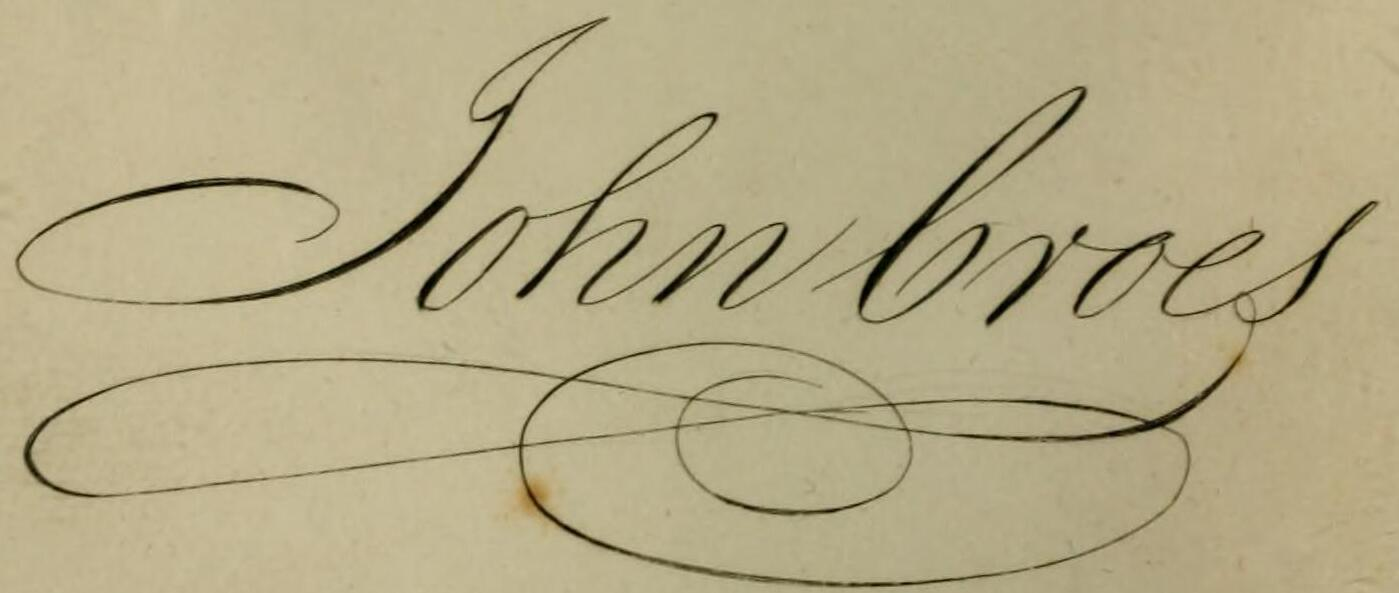
- Signature

John Croes (June 1, 1762 – July 26, 1832) was a prelate in the Episcopal Church who served as the first Bishop of New Jersey.

== Early life and education ==
Croes was born on June 1, 1762, in Elizabeth, New Jersey, the son of two German immigrants, Jacob Croes and Charlotte Christiana Feigart. He served in the Revolutionary War as a sergeant and quartermaster. He studied for the ministry of the Episcopal Church and was ordained deacon by Bishop William White in Philadelphia, on February 28, 1790, and priest on March 4, 1792.

== Career ==
Croes was uniformly active and zealous in the service of the church, in both diocesan and general conventions. He first served as rector of Trinity Church, Swedesboro, New Jersey, and was called rector of Christ Church, New Brunswick, New Jersey. In 1801, and he also served as principal of Rutgers Preparatory School. During the early decades of the 19th century, he was a slave owner with at least four slaves in his household in New Brunswick.

Walter Herbert Stowe wrote in 1966, that Croes was symbolic of the Episcopal Church ceasing to be exclusively English, coming from a lower class background, restoring a more democratized and simple Christian character to the episcopate without pomp and circumstance, and rejuvenating the standing of the church in New Jersey.

He was elected bishop of New Jersey in the summer, and was consecrated at St Peter's Church in Philadelphia on November 19, 1815. He is buried beneath the chancel of Christ Church in New Brunswick, New Jersey.

== See also ==
- Succession of Bishops of the Episcopal Church in the United States
