= St. Mary's Episcopal Church (Provo, Utah) =

Coordinates: 40.236803°N 111.659745°W

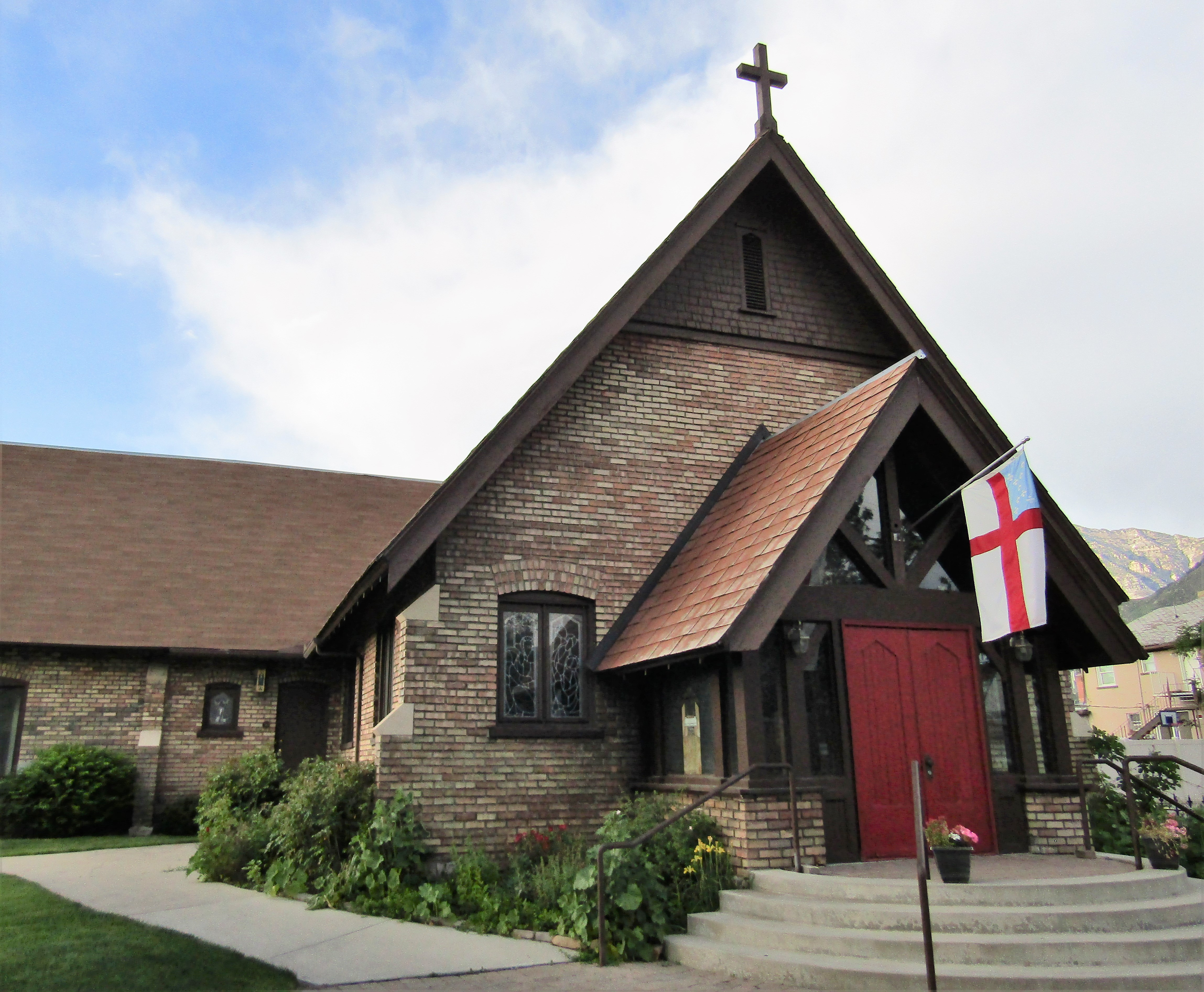
Episcopal Church in Provo, Utah.

St. Mary's Episcopal Church, in Provo, Utah, is a congregation of the Episcopal Diocese of Utah in the Episcopal Church in the United States of America. The church building was built in 1907; in 1962, 4,800 square feet (450 m^{2}) was added to make room for a new church office, parish hall, Sunday school, and the church library.

== History ==
Reverend George Townsend, the first resident Episcopal cleric in Provo, organized St. Mary's Episcopal Mission in 1892. It was during this period that he began gathering broken and discarded bricks to build what is now the original church. While the architect is unknown, St. Mary's English Gothic Design has been described as "a little box of place, an old dwelling fixed nicely inside." However, St. Mary's defining stained glass windows were not installed until the time of the Reverend John Howes (1937-1949).

When St. Mary's Church opened in 1907 it was a small congregation consisting of only eleven parishioners. With the establishment of the nearby Geneva Steel in the mid 1940s, St. Mary's saw a boom in its growth. Under the leadership of the Reverend Philip K. Kemp, the members of St. Mary's voted to change from a mission to be a parish. Father Kemp died the day after St. Mary's was elevated as a parish. At the time, St. Mary's membership was 131.

Starting in the 1960s St. Mary's and the Episcopal Church began to become known for their political and social progressivism. At St. Mary's, Reverend Wood was the first to focus St. Mary's ministries on social issues. It was during his ministry that St. Mary's became a host to talks on civil rights, capital punishment, and working with the Utah State Hospital. Following in Wood's footsteps, Reverend J. A. Frazer Crocker Jr. (1967–72) encouraged anti-war protest and supported the ordination of women. A former member of St. Mary's, Reverend Jeannette Ridlon Piccard, was one of the first women to be ordained to the Episcopal Clergy. One of St. Mary's strongest proponents of Civil Rights was Reverend Alan C. Tull who served during the early and mid 1990s.

== Present-day ==
Contemporarily, St. Mary's continues to pursue a progressive theology and ministry. Members of St. Mary's Church helped establish the Utah County Food & Care Coalition, and the current Deacon of St. Mary's, Craig A. Klein, continues to serve on their Board of Directors. The church's parish hall and library host more than twenty addiction and LGBT support groups that meet throughout the week at St. Mary's. St. Mary's has also partnered with the Utah Pride Center to provide weekly counseling for LGBT teenagers, young adults, and adults. The church is also part of the Interfaith & Musical Exchange program in Utah County that has hosted many interfaith worship services, and the clergy is active in the Utah Valley Ministerial Association.

== See also ==
- Episcopal Diocese of Utah
