= Sally French =

American Episcopal bishop

The Right Reverend Sally French
- Bishop of New Jersey
- Church: Episcopal Church
- Diocese: New Jersey
- Elected: January 28, 2023
- In office: 2023–present
- Predecessor: William H. Stokes

Orders
- Ordination: January 25, 2000 (deacon); June 3, 2001 (priest) by Victoria Matthews (deacon, priest)
- Consecration: June 24, 2023 by Mary Gray-Reeves

Personal details
- Born: 1970 (age 55–56) Torbay, UK
- Denomination: Anglican
- Spouse: Clarke French
- Children: 2
- Education: Trinity College, Toronto; Virginia Theological Seminary

Sally French (born 1970) is the 13th Bishop of the Episcopal Diocese of New Jersey. French has served in this role since 2023. She was consecrated on June 24, 2023, at Trinity Episcopal Cathedral (Trenton, New Jersey).

== Early life and education ==
French grew up in Toronto in a secular family. She holds a Bachelor of Arts in Economics and a Master of Divinity from Trinity College, Toronto. She also earned a Doctor of Ministry degree from Virginia Theological Seminary.

== Ministry ==
French, who began her ministry career as a priest in the Anglican Church of Canada before becoming an Episcopal priest, worked as a parish priest for twenty years. She also supervised the revision of the Episcopal Church’s Journey to Adulthood (J2A) youth formation curriculum. French served as President of the Standing Committee in the Diocese of North Carolina. She also served in that diocese as Canon for Regional Ministry and Collaborative Innovation, beginning in 2020.

== Personal life ==
French is married to the Rev. Clarke French, a parish priest. Together, they have two children.

== See also ==
- List of Episcopal bishops of the United States
- List of bishops of the Episcopal Church in the United States of America
