= St. Mary's Episcopal Church (Burlington, New Jersey) =

Historic church in New Jersey, United States

- New St. Mary's Episcopal Church
- U.S. National Register of Historic Places
- U.S. National Historic Landmark
- U.S. Historic district – Contributing property
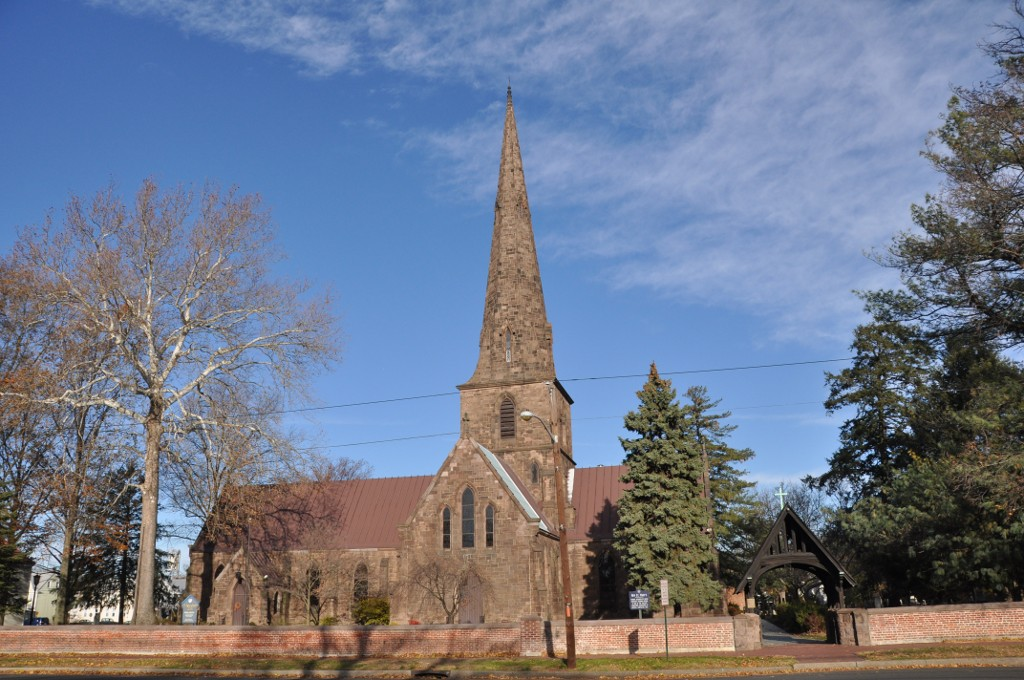
- New St. Mary's Church

- Location within Burlington County, New Jersey Location within New Jersey Location within the United States
- Location: 145 West Broad Street; Burlington, New Jersey
- Coordinates: 40°4′37″N 74°51′43″W
- Area: 6.2 acres (2.5 ha)
- Built: 1846-1854
- Architect: Richard Upjohn et al.
- Architectural style: Gothic Revival
- Part of: Burlington Historic District (ID75001124)
- NRHP reference No.: 72000770

Significant dates
- Added to NRHP: May 31, 1972
- Designated NHL: June 24, 1986
- Designated CP: March 13, 1975

St. Mary's Episcopal Church is a historic Episcopal parish in Burlington, Burlington County, New Jersey, United States. The original church was built in 1703. It was supplemented with a new church on adjacent land in 1854. On May 31, 1972, the new church was added to the National Register of Historic Places and on June 24, 1986, it was declared a National Historic Landmark. It is within the Burlington Historic District.

It is a parish of the Episcopal Diocese of New Jersey. The church reported 157 members in 2023. Plate and pledge income reported for the congregation in 2024 was $217,967. Average Sunday attendance (ASA) in 2023 was 68 persons.

== Old church ==
In 1695 settlers acquired land for a cemetery at West Broad and Wood streets. In 1702 the Society for the Propagation of the Gospel in Foreign Parts sent Anglican missionaries from England to New Jersey. One of them, John Talbot, became rector of St. Mary's Church (built in 1703) in 1705. It is the first and oldest Episcopal congregation in New Jersey.

As the congregation grew, parishioners decided to build a new, larger church. They commissioned Richard Upjohn to design it. In 1846, construction began on adjoining land at 145 West Broad Street. It was consecrated in 1854.

== New church ==
New St. Mary's Church was constructed between 1846 and 1854. It is one of the earliest attempts in the United States to "follow a specific English medieval church model for which measured drawings existed." This Gothic Revival-style church was designed by Richard Upjohn, who modeled it after St. John's Church in Shottesbrooke, England. It helped to firmly establish Upjohn as a practitioner of Gothic design. It is a massive brownstone church with a long nave. The crossing is topped by a tall stone spire that has eight bells cast in England in 1865 by Thomas Mears II at the Whitechapel Bell Foundry. It has been designated as a National Historic Landmark.

=== Fire ===
In 1976 while renovations were being done to the church a mistake made by one of the workers led to a fire which caused extreme roof and interior damage. The fire was discovered in the early hours of April 15, 1976, Holy Thursday. Eventually, a general alarm fire was declared bringing hundreds of firemen from Burlington City, Burlington Township, Beverly-Edgewater Park, and Willingboro in New Jersey as well as Bristol across the bridge in Pennsylvania.

== Gallery ==
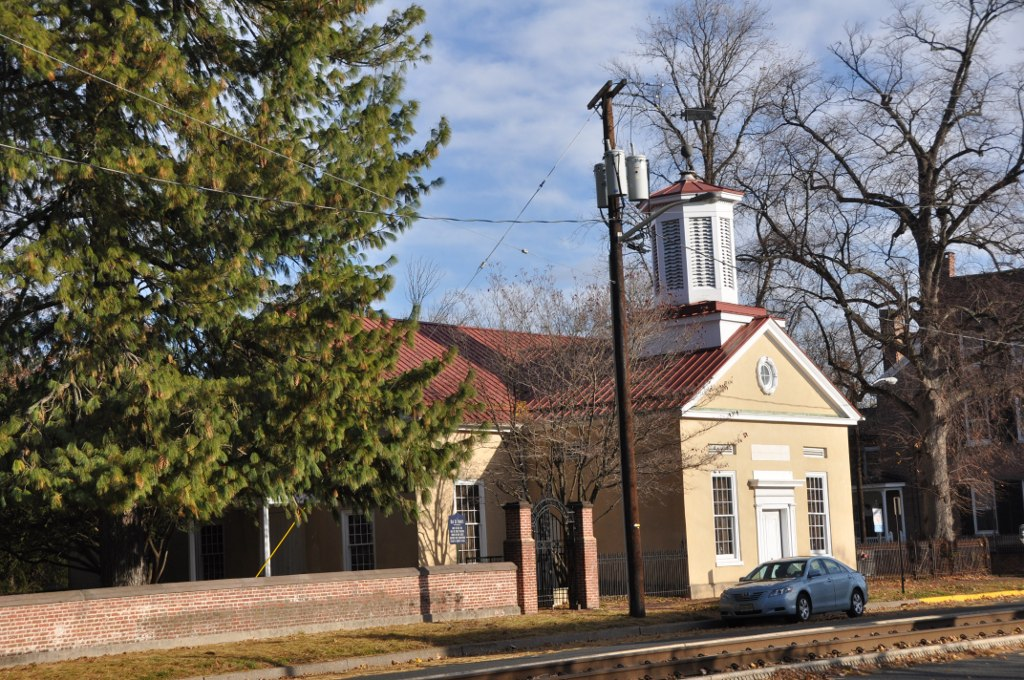
Old St. Mary's Church

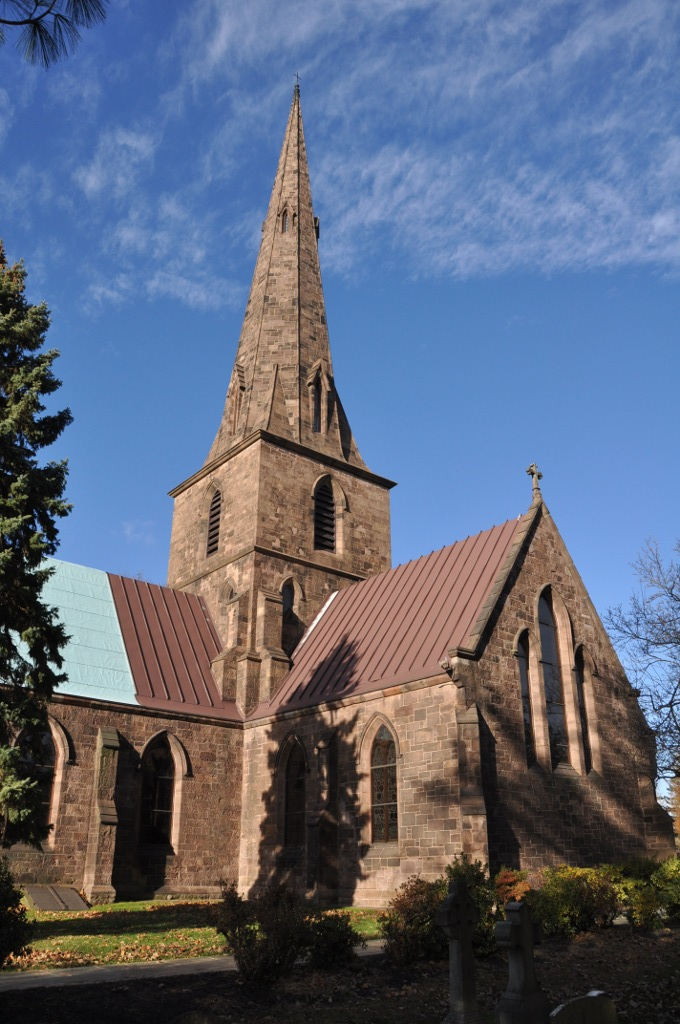
New St. Mary's Church

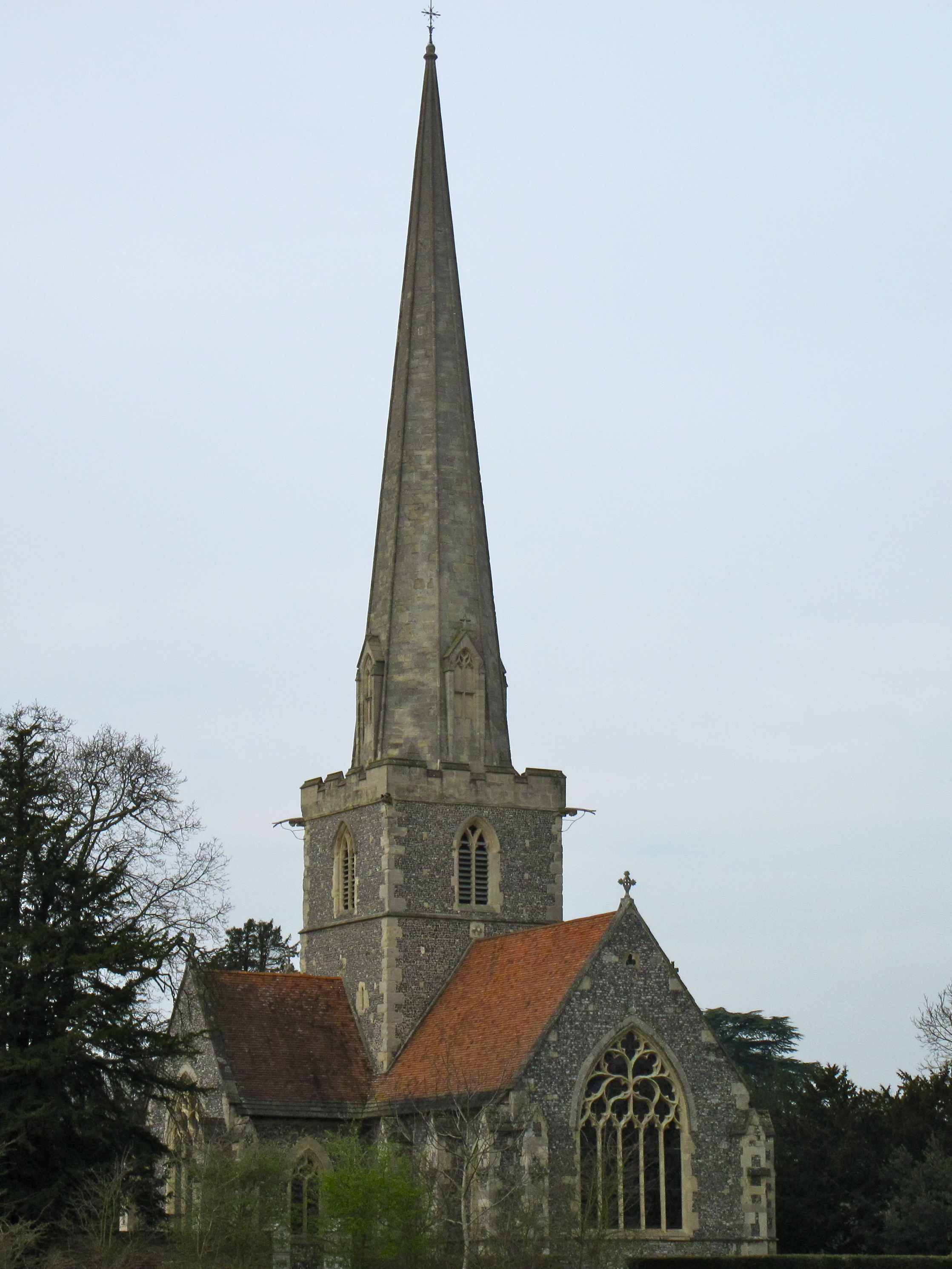
Church in Shottesbrooke

== Notable burials ==
- Joseph Bloomfield (1753–1823), Governor of New Jersey.
- Elias Boudinot (1740–1821), President of the Continental Congress from 1782 to 1783.
- William Bradford (1755–1795), United States Attorney General
- Daniel Coxe, Governor of West Jersey
- George Washington Doane (1799–1859), second bishop of the Episcopal Diocese of New Jersey.
- Rowland Ellis
- Edward Burd Grubb Jr. (1841–1913), American Civil War Brevet Brigadier General.
- Franklin D'Olier, founder of the American Legion
- James Kinsey (1731–1803), Chief Justice of the New Jersey Supreme Court from 1789 to 1803.
- Joseph McIlvaine (1769–1826), represented New Jersey in the United States Senate from 1823 to 1826.
- William Milnor (1769–1848), member of the U.S. House of Representatives from Pennsylvania and Mayor of Philadelphia.
- William H. Odenheimer, third Bishop of New Jersey
- Isabel Paterson (1886–1961), libertarian author.
- John H. Pugh (1827–1905), represented New Jersey's 2nd congressional district from 1877 to 1879.
- Garret D. Wall (1783–1850), United States Senator from 1835 to 1841.
- James Walter Wall (1820–1872), United States Senator and Mayor of Burlington, New Jersey.

== See also ==
- List of National Historic Landmarks in New Jersey
- List of the oldest buildings in New Jersey
- St. Mary's Episcopal Church (disambiguation)
- National Register of Historic Places listings in Burlington County, New Jersey
