= Episcopal Diocese of New Jersey =

Episcopal Church diocese in the US

Coordinates: 40.23059°N 74.78655°W

Diocese of New Jersey Diœcesis Novæ Cæsariensis

Location
- Country: United States
- Ecclesiastical province: Province II

Statistics
- Congregations: 134 (2025)
- Members: 26,788 (2025)

Information
- Denomination: Episcopal Church
- Established: July 6, 1785
- Cathedral: Trinity Cathedral
- Language: English, Spanish

Current leadership
- Bishop: Sally French

Map
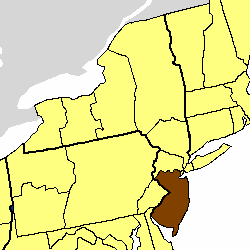
- Location of the Diocese of New Jersey

Website
- dioceseofnj.org

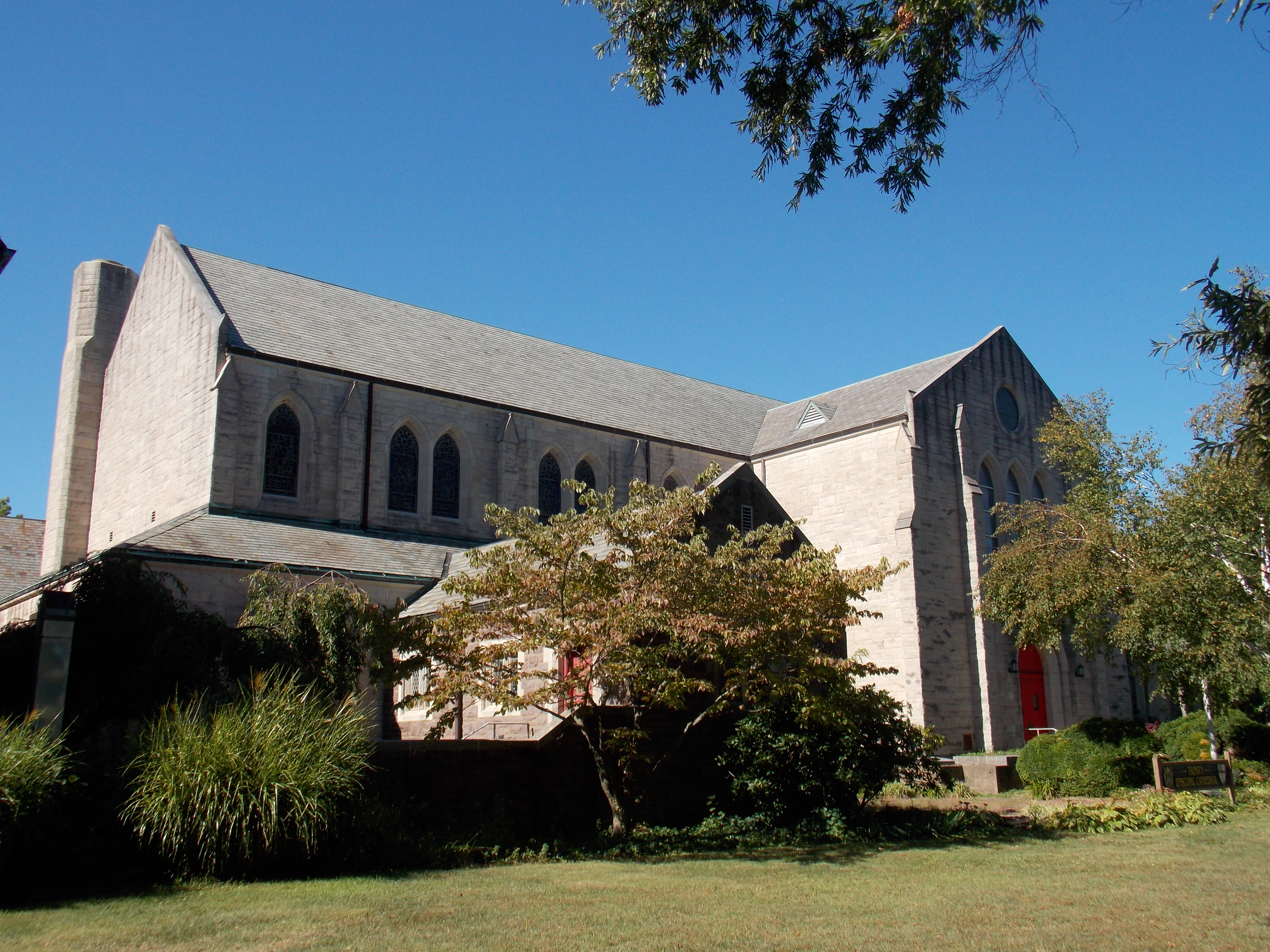
Trinity Cathedral

The Episcopal Diocese of New Jersey forms part of Province II of the Episcopal Church in the United States of America. It is made up of the southern and central New Jersey counties of Union, Middlesex, Somerset, Hunterdon, Mercer, Monmouth, Ocean, Burlington, Camden, Atlantic, Gloucester, Salem, Cumberland, and Cape May. It is the second oldest of the nine original Dioceses of the Episcopal Church. Activities in the diocese began in 1685 with services at St. Peter's parish in Perth Amboy. The diocese itself was founded in 1785.

The diocese originally included all of the state of New Jersey, but was divided in 1874, when the northern third of the state split off to form the Diocese of Northern New Jersey; this was later renamed to become the Diocese of Newark. The Diocese of New Jersey has the sixth-largest number of parishes in the Episcopal Church, and the eighth-largest number of baptized communicants. It has a reputation for broad ethnic and socio-economic diversity.

The Diocese of New Jersey currently has a total of 134 congregations. The diocese is under the jurisdiction of Bishop Sally French whose seat is at Trinity Cathedral in Trenton. The largest parish in the diocese is Trinity Church, Princeton.

The diocese reported 41,114 members in 2015 and 26,788 members in 2025. Plate and pledge income for the 134 filing congregations of the diocese in 2024 was $20,113,569; average Sunday attendance (ASA) in 2025 was 7,462 persons. This was a relative decrease from ASA of 11,751 reported in 2015.

== Trinity Cathedral ==
The cathedral of the diocese has been Trinity Cathedral in Trenton since 1931, following the mergers of Trinity Church and All Saints' Churches in 1930. It is currently located on West St. Street in the location of the former All Saints', Trenton. Earlier pro-cathedrals have included Christ Church, New Brunswick, Saint Mary's, Burlington, and Christ Church, Trenton.

Diocesan House, which holds the administrative offices of the diocese sits across the street in a converted Victorian home and adjacent casino built in 1912 and 1927 respectively. The buildings were bought by the diocese in 1943.

== Bishops of New Jersey ==
- John Croes, 1815–1832 (1st Bishop of New Jersey)
- George Washington Doane, 1832–1859 (2nd Bishop of New Jersey)
- William Henry Odenheimer, 1859–1874 (3rd Bishop of New Jersey and 1st Bishop of Newark)
- John Scarborough, 1875–1914 (4th Bishop of New Jersey)
- Paul Matthews, 1915–1937 (5th Bishop of New Jersey)
  - Albion W. Knight, Coadjutor, 1923–1935
  - Ralph Ernest Urban, Suffragan, 1932–1935
- Wallace John Gardner, 1937–1954 (6th Bishop of New Jersey)
- Alfred L. Banyard, 1955–1973 (7th Bishop of New Jersey)
- Albert W. Van Duzer, 1973–1982 (8th Bishop of New Jersey)
- G. P. Mellick Belshaw, 1983–1994 (9th Bishop of New Jersey)
- Joe Morris Doss, 1995–2001 (10th Bishop of New Jersey)
- George Edward Councell, 2003–2013 (11th Bishop of New Jersey)
- William H. Stokes, 2013–2023 (12th Bishop of New Jersey)
- Sally French, 2023–present (13th Bishop of New Jersey)
