= William Henry Odenheimer =

Third Episcopal Bishop of New Jersey

The Right Reverend William Henry Odenheimer D.D.
- Bishop of Northern New Jersey
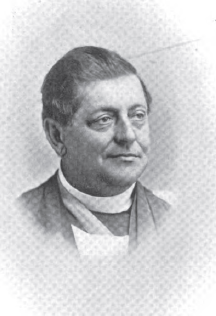
- Church: Episcopal Church
- Diocese: Northern New Jersey
- Elected: November 12, 1874
- In office: 1874–1879
- Successor: Thomas A. Starkey
- Previous post: Bishop of New Jersey (1859-1874)

Orders
- Ordination: October 3, 1841 by Henry Onderdonk
- Consecration: October 13, 1859 by William Meade

Personal details
- Born: August 11, 1817 Philadelphia, Pennsylvania, United States
- Died: August 14, 1879 (aged 62) Burlington, New Jersey, United States
- Buried: St Mary's Church
- Denomination: Anglican
- Parents: John W. Odenheimer & Henrietta Burns
- Spouse: Anne Randall Shaw
- Children: 11

William Henry Odenheimer (August 11, 1817 – August 14, 1879) was the third Episcopal Bishop of New Jersey and the first of Northern New Jersey.

== Early life ==
Odenheimer was born in Philadelphia in 1817, the son of John W. Odenheimer and Henrietta Burns Odenheimer. Odenheimer was prepared at Flushing, Long Island, at the famous Flushing Institute founded in 1828 by the Reverend William Augustus Muhlenberg (1796-1877). Scholars emanating from the Flushing Institute very often matriculated in the third year at Penn, Virginia, Harvard, Yale, Princeton, and other colleges. Odenheimer graduated from the University of Pennsylvania in 1835. He would have left Penn just upon the arrival of another Muhlenberg "school son," J. Lloyd Breck (1818-1876), the legendary missionary educator of Wisconsin, Minnesota, and California. Odenheimer next attended the General Theological Seminary, graduating in 1838. In 1839, he married Anne Randall Shaw. They would have eleven children but only two, Anne and Margaret, would live to adulthood.

Odenheimer was ordained deacon three years later, in 1838 by Bishop Henry U. Onderdonk, and was ordained priest by the same bishop in 1841. After his ordination to the priesthood, he served as rector of St. Peter's Church in Philadelphia, remaining at the parish from his ordination until his elevation to the episcopate. While there, Odenheimer received a doctorate of divinity from the University of Pennsylvania. He also published several books, including "The True Catholic No Romanist," (1842) about the Oxford Movement, and "Essay on Canon Law" (1847). Odenheimer was a strong supporter of the Oxford Movement and changed the organization of St. Peter's to reflect that preference. His theological beliefs were out of step with the rising anti-Catholicism of Philadelphia in the 1840s, but Odenheimer sought to steer a middle course between the extremes of Catholicism and Protestantism.

== Bishop of New Jersey ==
Odenheimer was consecrated the third Bishop of New Jersey in 1859. He was the 66th bishop in the Episcopal Church, and was consecrated in St. Paul's Church, Richmond, Virginia by Bishops William Meade, Samuel Allen McCoskry, and William Rollinson Whittingham, along with other co-consecrators. While bishop, Odenheimer received an additional degree, a doctor of canon law from the University of Oxford, in 1867. During the first fifteen years of his episcopate he confirmed nearly 16,000 people, and the number reached 20,000 before his death. He visited the parishes of his diocese often until 1866, when injuries from a fall broke his kneecaps and forced him to curtail his travels. As his diocese grew, church authorities found it necessary to divide it into northern and southern portions in 1874, with Odenheimer continuing as bishop of the northern diocese, later renamed the Diocese of Newark. He was succeeded as diocesan bishop for New Jersey by John Scarborough.

He died in 1879 in Burlington, New Jersey, and was buried at St. Mary's Episcopal Church in that town.

== Bibliography ==
- Batterson, Hermon Griswold (1878). A Sketch-book of the American Episcopate. Philadelphia: J. B. Lippencott & Co.
- Fish, Lawrence D. "A Biography of the Right Reverend William Henry Odenheimer" (PDF). The Episcopal Diocese of New Jersey.
- Perry, William Stevens (1895). The Episcopate in America. New York: The Christian Literature Company.
- Wilson, J. G.; Fiske, J., eds. (1900). "Odenheimer, William Henry" . Appletons' Cyclopædia of American Biography. Vol. 4. New York: D. Appleton. pp. 556–557.
