= Trinity Episcopal Cathedral (Trenton, New Jersey) =

Trinity Cathedral
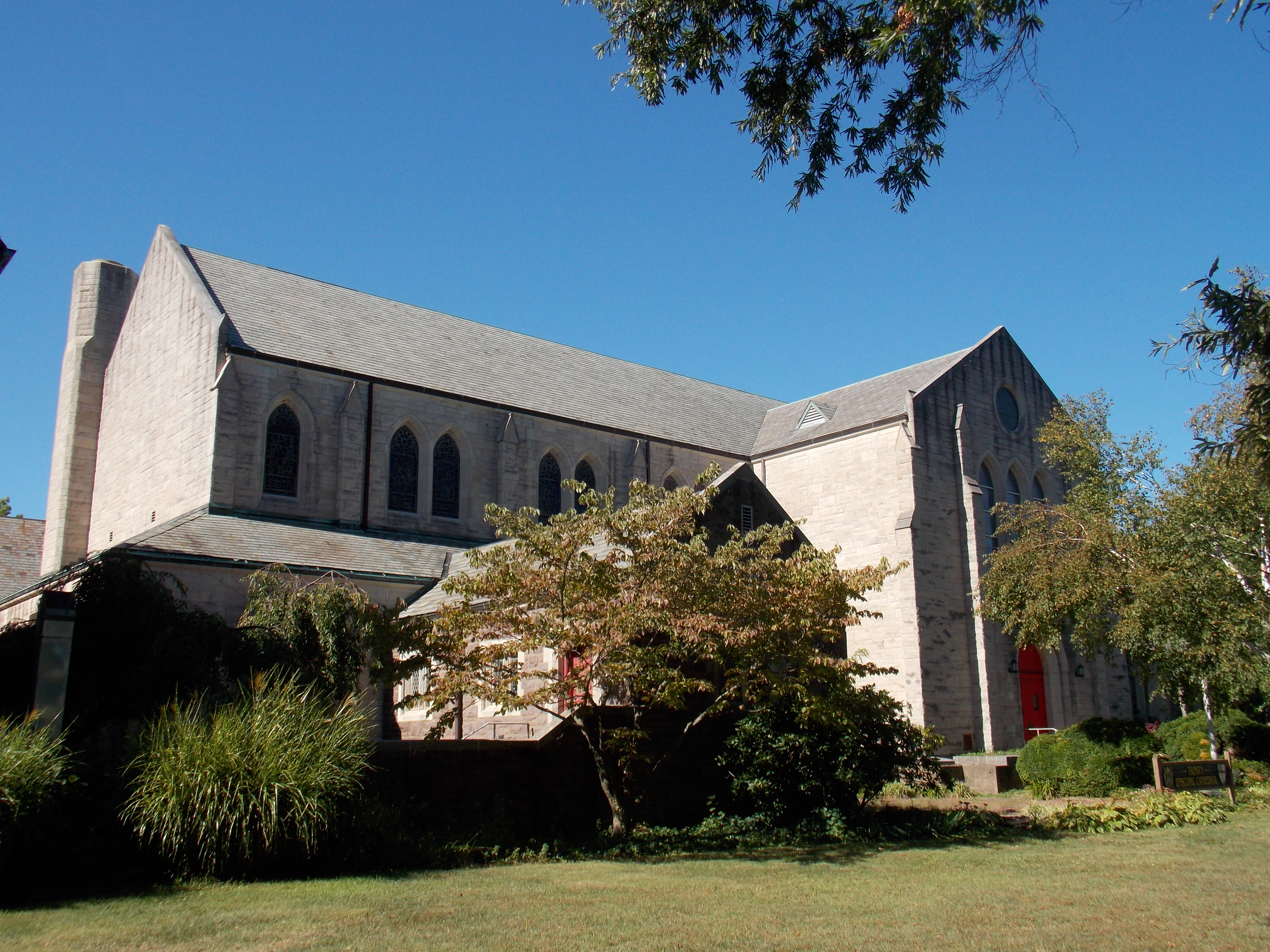

- Location within Mercer County, New Jersey
- 40°13′45.83″N 74°47′13.21″W
- Location: 801 W. State St. Trenton, New Jersey
- Country: United States
- Denomination: Episcopal Church in the United States of America
- Website: www.trinitycathedralnj.org

History
- Founded: November 1, 1930
- Dedication: January 24, 1954
- Consecrated: 1965

Architecture
- Architect(s): P.L. Fowler; Samuel Mountford; A.E. Micklewright
- Style: Gothic Revival

Specifications
- Height: 60 feet (18 m)

Administration
- Diocese: New Jersey

Clergy
- Bishop: The Right Rev. Sally French
- Dean: The Very Rev. René Rory John

Trinity Episcopal Cathedral is an Episcopal cathedral located in Trenton, New Jersey, United States. It is the seat of the Diocese of New Jersey.

The cathedral reported 469 members in 2025. Plate and pledge income for the congregation in 2025 was $364,351 with average Sunday attendance (ASA) of 93.

== History ==
The Rev. Dr. Alfred Baker, rector of Trinity Church in Princeton, New Jersey, has the first recorded mention of a cathedral for the Diocese of New Jersey in a plan he proposed at the Diocesan Convention of 1908. The Rt. Rev. John Scarborough approved of Baker's plan and established a committee of five clergy and five laymen to study the possibility of establishing a cathedral system in the diocese. A plan was proposed and adopted the following year and Bishop Scarborough appointed a Provisional Cathedral Chapter of ten clergy, ten laymen and the Chancellor. The Trustees of the Cathedral Foundation in the Diocese of New Jersey was established in 1913. Over the next several years resolutions to establish a cathedral were passed at the convention, including a scheme to raise the necessary funds. By 1915 Bishop Scarborough was dead and the Rt. Rev. Paul Matthews replaced him. Bishop Matthews saw the need for cathedral works, but not for a cathedra. However, he accepted the offer of the vestry of Christ Church in Trenton of their church as a pro-cathedral. He believed in this way people could visualize the diocesan and cathedral work. The Cathedral League was organized with the responsibility to further the work of the cathedral and to raise the necessary funds. The Rev. Baker was installed as the first Cathedral Dean in 1919.

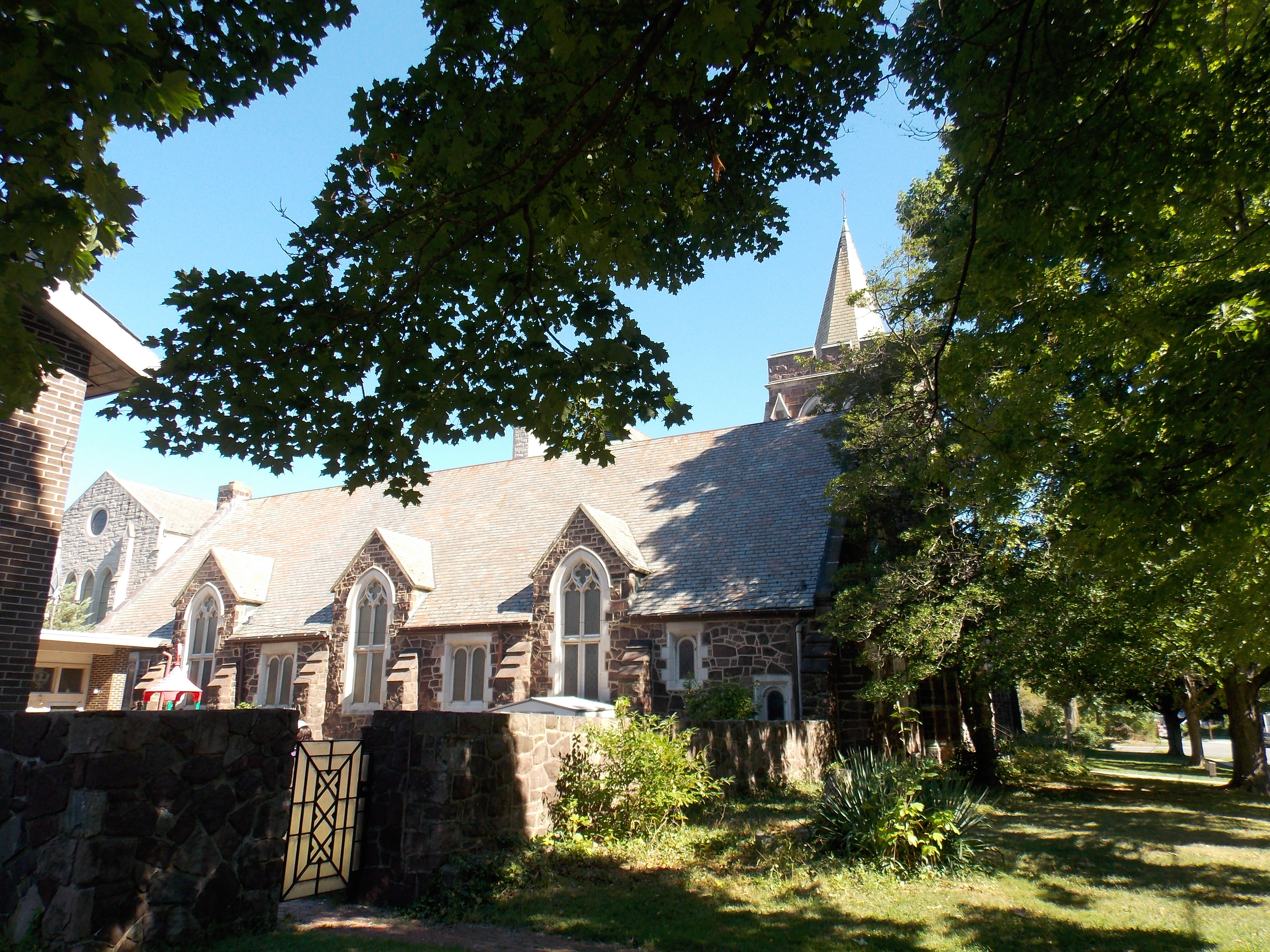
The former All Saints Church remains intact as a part of the Cathedral Complex.

It was at a meeting of the Foundation on April 24, 1930 that Bishop Matthews mentioned a plan to make Trinity Church in Trenton the diocesan cathedral. The vestry at Trinity approved of the idea and Christ Church, which was only a cathedral in a limited sense, was not opposed. The necessary resolutions were passed by all the entities involved throughout 1930 and on November 1, 1930 Trinity Church officially became Trinity Cathedral. On November 20, 1930 Trinity and All Saints Church agreed to merge. The merger permitted the diocese to acquire land around the All Saints location for the location of the new cathedral. The Trinity property did not allow for this possibility. On January 25, 1931 Bishop Matthews was enthroned in Trinity Cathedral. The Rev. Ralph E. Urban was installed as the Cathedral Dean and the Rev. Hamilton Schuyler as Honorary Canon on February 23 of the same year. The Standing Committee gave its consent to Trinity Church to change its corporate name to Trinity Cathedral on March 16, 1931. The crypt of the present cathedral church was begun in 1935 and completed a year later. The cathedral itself was dedicated on January 24, 1954, and consecrated in 1965. In subsequent years the cathedral has become a parish church.

== Architecture ==
The cathedral was designed by P.L. Fowler, Samuel Mountford and A.E. Micklewright in the Gothic Revival style. The roof of the structure reaches 60 feet (18 m) above the ground. The High Altar is composed of rose-colored marble and rests on two platforms of green Italian marble. In the north transept is the Caesarea Altar that features carved figures of the Twelve Apostles. The south transept contains the Elizabeth's Chapel that features 14 Russian icons and a statue of the Blessed Virgin Mary and child in a 15th-century style.

The crypt below the cathedral follows the Norman style that is characterized by round arches and octagon-shaped pillars. The High Altar there is constructed of sandstone, with a reredos of limestone. It has depictions of Moses with the Tablets, and St. John the Evangelist.

The former All Saints Church was built in 1896 and now serves as the Synod Hall. The rose window in the former choir loft contains symbols of the Holy Trinity. The former reredos in the back of the room contains the seal of the diocese and the shields of the Apostles. Images of saints and leaders of the church are depicted in the stained glass windows.

The All Saints Chapel is also known as the Bishop Urban Memorial Chapel in honor of the cathedral's first dean. It features a carved Rood Screen that separates the nave and the chancel. On top of the screen is a depiction of the crucified Christ that is flanked by his mother Mary and the apostle John. The stained glass windows in the chancel depict the life of Mary. They include images of her mother Anne, her father Joachim, her cousin Elizabeth, and the Flight into Egypt. Old Testament prophets and saints of the Anglican tradition are found on the windows in the nave. The Stations of the Cross, also in the nave, were executed by an artist who was a Chinese immigrant. The tree bells located in the chapel spire were from the former Trinity Church. They were a gift from the City of Trenton in thanksgiving for the end of the American Civil War.

== See also ==
- List of the Episcopal cathedrals of the United States
- List of cathedrals in the United States
