= Unwritten =

Unwritten may refer to:

- Unwritten (album), a 2004 album by Natasha Bedingfield
  - "Unwritten" (song), the title song
- "Unwritten" (House), a 2010 television episode
- Unwritten, a musical composition by Mohammed Fairouz
- The Unwritten, a 2009–2015 comic book series by Mike Carey and Peter Gross

== See also ==
- Unwritten Law (disambiguation)
- Unwritten rule, or unspoken rule
