= Rudolf Eickemeyer Jr. =

American photographer

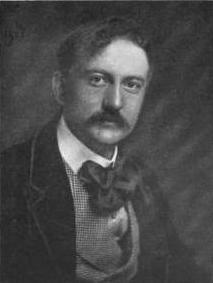
- Eickemeyer, c. 1904
- Born: August 7, 1862; Yonkers, New York
- Died: April 25, 1932 (aged 69); Yonkers, New York
- Resting place: Woodlawn Cemetery; Bronx, New York
- Notable work: Down South (1900), The Old Farm (1901), Winter (1903)
- Spouse(s): Isabelle Hicks (1891-1916, her death), Florence Brevoort (1918-1932, his death)
- Parent(s): Rudolf Eickemeyer and Mary True

Rudolf Eickemeyer Jr. (August 7, 1862 – April 25, 1932) was an American pictorialist photographer, active in the late 19th and early 20th centuries. He was one of the first Americans (along with Alfred Stieglitz) to be admitted to the Linked Ring, and his photographs won dozens of medals at exhibitions around the world in the 1890s and early 1900s. He was famous among his contemporaries for his portraits of high-society women, most notably model and singer Evelyn Nesbit. Eickemeyer's best-known photographs are now part of the collections of the Smithsonian Institution.

== Life ==
Eickemeyer was born in Yonkers, New York, in 1862. Though widely travelled, he would live in Yonkers his entire life. Eickemeyer's father had fled to New York in the early 1850s following political upheavals in his native Bavaria, and became a noted inventor. His firm, Osterheld and Eickemeyer, invented a hat-blocking machine that revolutionized the hat industry, and made a number of advancements in electrical lighting. The younger Eickemeyer joined his father's firm as a draftsman in 1879.

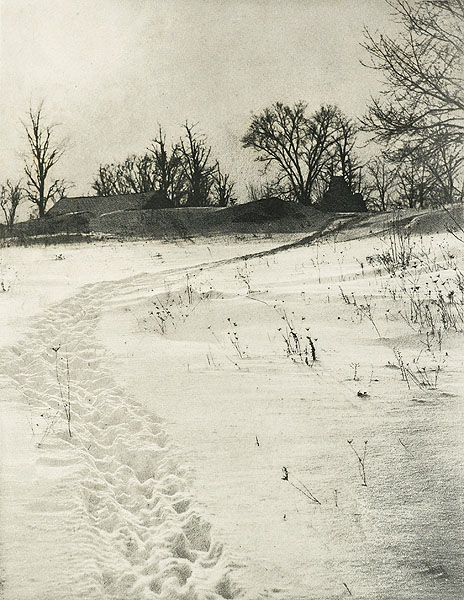
Sweet Home

Eickemeyer first became interested in photography as a means to help document his father's inventions. He purchased his first camera, an "abnormally thick" Platyscope B, on February 2, 1884, and took his first photograph, an albumen print of his sister, the following day. Immediately drawn to the camera's artistic potential, Eickemeyer considered pursuing a career as a photographer, but his father disapproved, so he continued working for his father's firm.

Eickemeyer won 11 medals at the Yonkers Photo Club's Lantern Slide Exhibition in October 1890, and over the subsequent decade, he collected over a hundred medals at exhibitions and salons around the world. After his father's death in 1895, he left his father's firm and joined the Carbon Studio in Manhattan, which specialized in portraits, and gained a reputation for photographs of high-society women. That year, he and Alfred Stieglitz became the first Americans admitted to the English pictorialist society, the Linked Ring. While Eickemeyer's work appeared in Stieglitz's Camera Notes, he was unimpressed with the rise of the Stieglitz-led Photo-Secession early in the following century. He was one of four Links who never joined the Photo-Secession, the others being F. Holland Day, Margaret Russell Foster, and C. Yarnall Abbott.

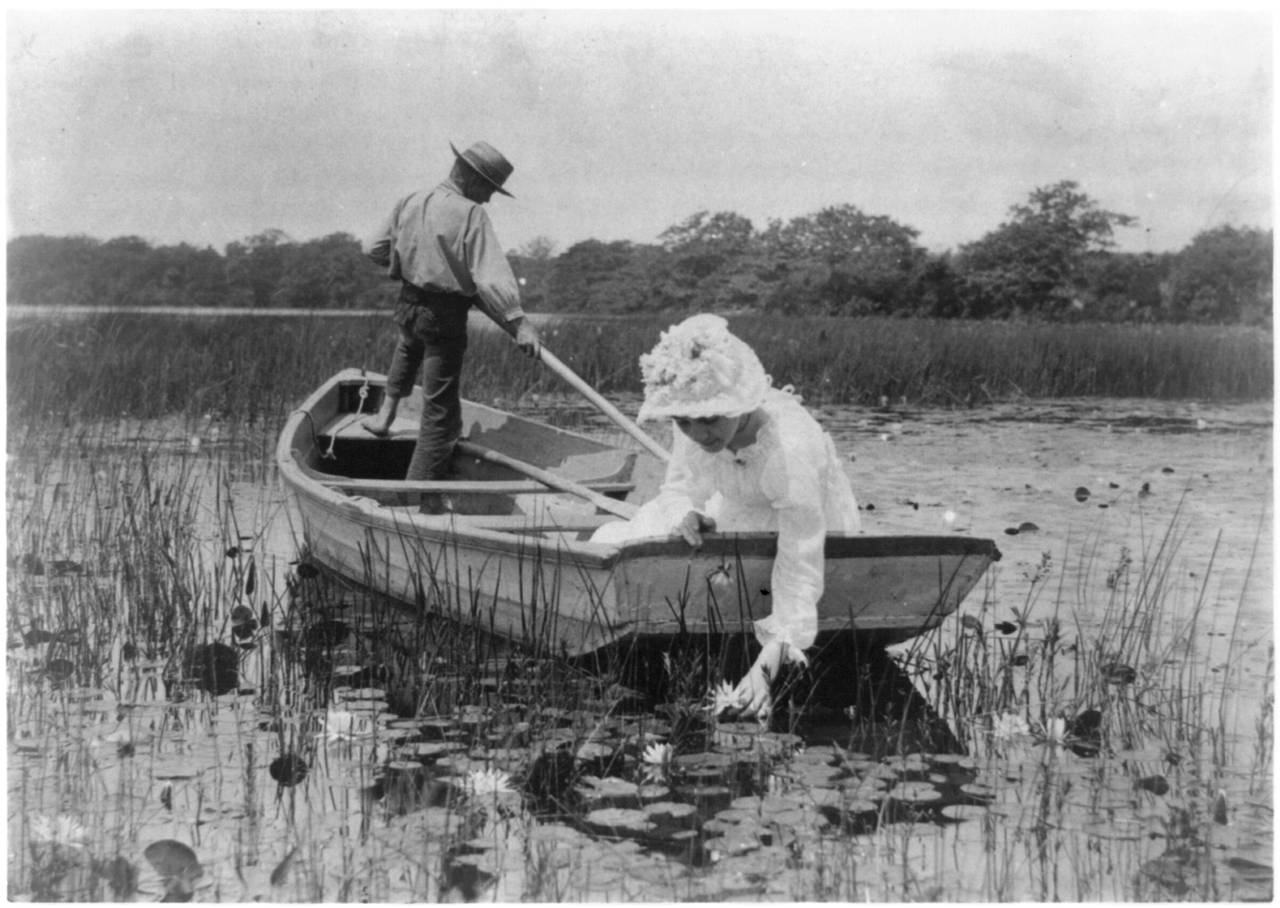
Lily Gatherer

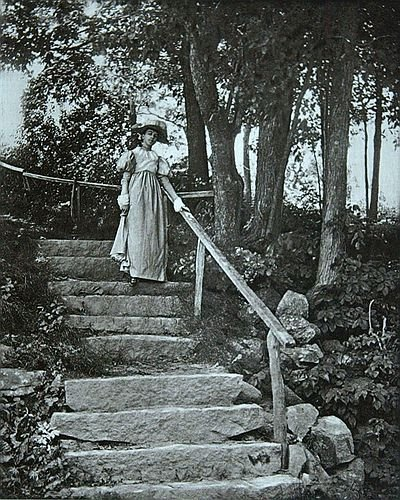
As She Comes Down the Stairs (1894). The model is Eickemeyer's wife, Isabelle

In 1900, Eickemeyer joined the New York Camera Club, and exhibited 154 frames in his first one-man show at the club. That same year, he published his first book, Down South, and was appointed art manager of the Campbell Art Studio on Fifth Avenue, with which he would remain intermittently until 1915. It was while at Campbell that Eickemeyer conducted his famous shoot of New York model Evelyn Nesbit.

Eickemeyer was awarded the gold medal for photography at the St. Louis World's Fair in 1904. The following year, he purchased half of the photographic firm, Davis and Stanford (renamed Davis and Eickemeyer), which operated out of a studio at 246 Fifth Avenue. In 1911, Eickemeyer was commissioned by William Randolph Hearst to photograph American wives of British peerage as part of the coronation ceremonies of King George V.

Eickemeyer hosted a retrospective of his work at the Anderson Galleries in New York in 1922, and made his last submissions to the London Salon in 1926. In 1929, he donated most of his best-known photographs to the Smithsonian Institution. The following year, he served as a judge in Kodak's international photography competition alongside Thomas Edison, John J. Pershing, Richard E. Byrd, and Benito Mussolini. He died at St. John's Hospital in Yonkers in 1932. The Hudson River Museum in Yonkers has a collection of over 200 examples of Eickemeyer's photography.

== Works ==
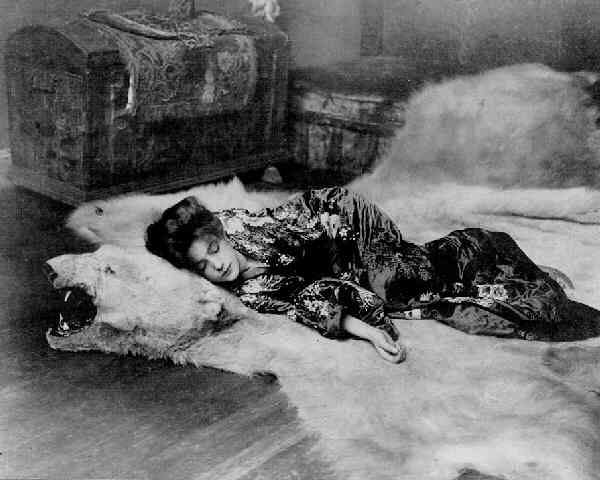
In My Studio, Evelyn Nesbit, Tired Butterfly: Eickemeyer's photo of Evelyn Nesbit lying on a bear-skin rug

As a pictorialist, Eickemeyer believed photographs were works of art. However, he believed in producing straightforward images and using natural elements to produce artistic effects instead of using photographic techniques (such as soft focus) to imitate traditional art. He was described by photography critic Sidney Allen as the "most versatile" pictorialist of his time, and excelled in both landscapes and portraits.

In 1893, Eickemeyer's photographs, Lily Gatherer and As She Comes Down the Stairs (for which his wife, Isabelle, posed) won silver medals at the Joint Annual Exhibition in Philadelphia, and the latter won the gold medal at the Hamburg International Exhibition. In 1894, Eickemeyer won sixteen medals in ten international exhibitions, including the Royal Photographic Society's Albert Medal for his Sweet Home. The following year, he won the Viceroy Gold Medal at the International Exhibition in Calcutta for his photograph, Kitten's Breakfast.

Photographer Roland Rood described Eickemeyer's portraiture photographs of women as "unexcelled, frequently unequaled." His 1901 shoot of New York model Evelyn Nesbit is arguably his best-known portrait work, and included a shot of Nesbit clad in a kimono and curled up on a bear-skin rug. Other well-known women photographed by Eickemeyer include opera singer Mary Garden and actress Lillian Russell.

Eickemeyer published three photographic books: Down South (1900), The Old Farm (1901), and Winter (1903). Down South documents the lives of African American sharecroppers on an Alabama plantation, using photographs taken by Eickemeyer during various trips to Alabama during the 1890s. The Old Farm is a collection of rural images, and Winter is a collection of artistic winter images accompanied by quotes from famous authors. Eickemeyer also provided photographic illustration for books by several other authors, including In and Out of the Nursery (1900), a collection of poems written by his sister, Eva.

=== Bibliography ===
- In and Out of the Nursery (1900) (written by Eva Rowland, illustrated by Eickemeyer)
- Down South (1900)
- The Old Farm (1901)
- Winter (1903)
- Nature and Culture (1904) (written by Hamilton Wright Mabie, illustrated by Eickemeyer)
- In the Open (1911) (written by Stanton Davis Kirkham, illustrated by Eickemeyer)

== Gallery ==
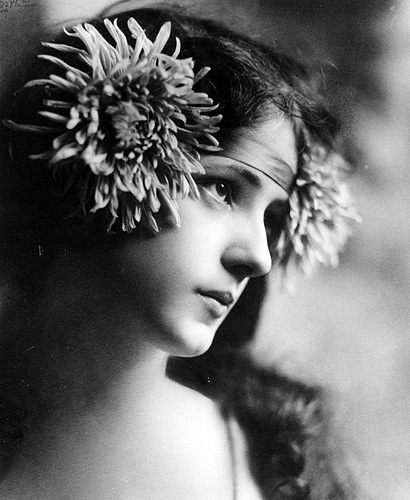
Evelyn Nesbit

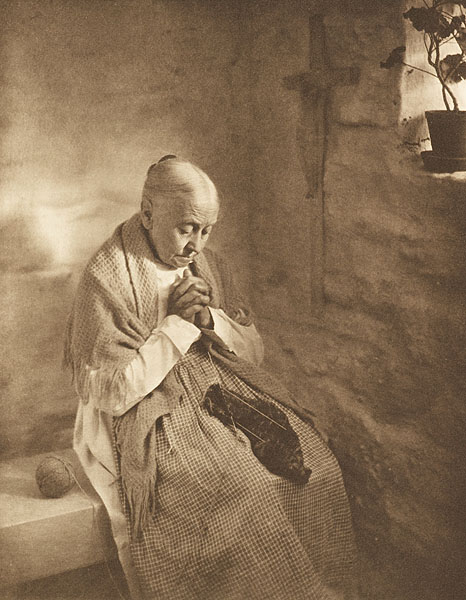
Vesper Bells

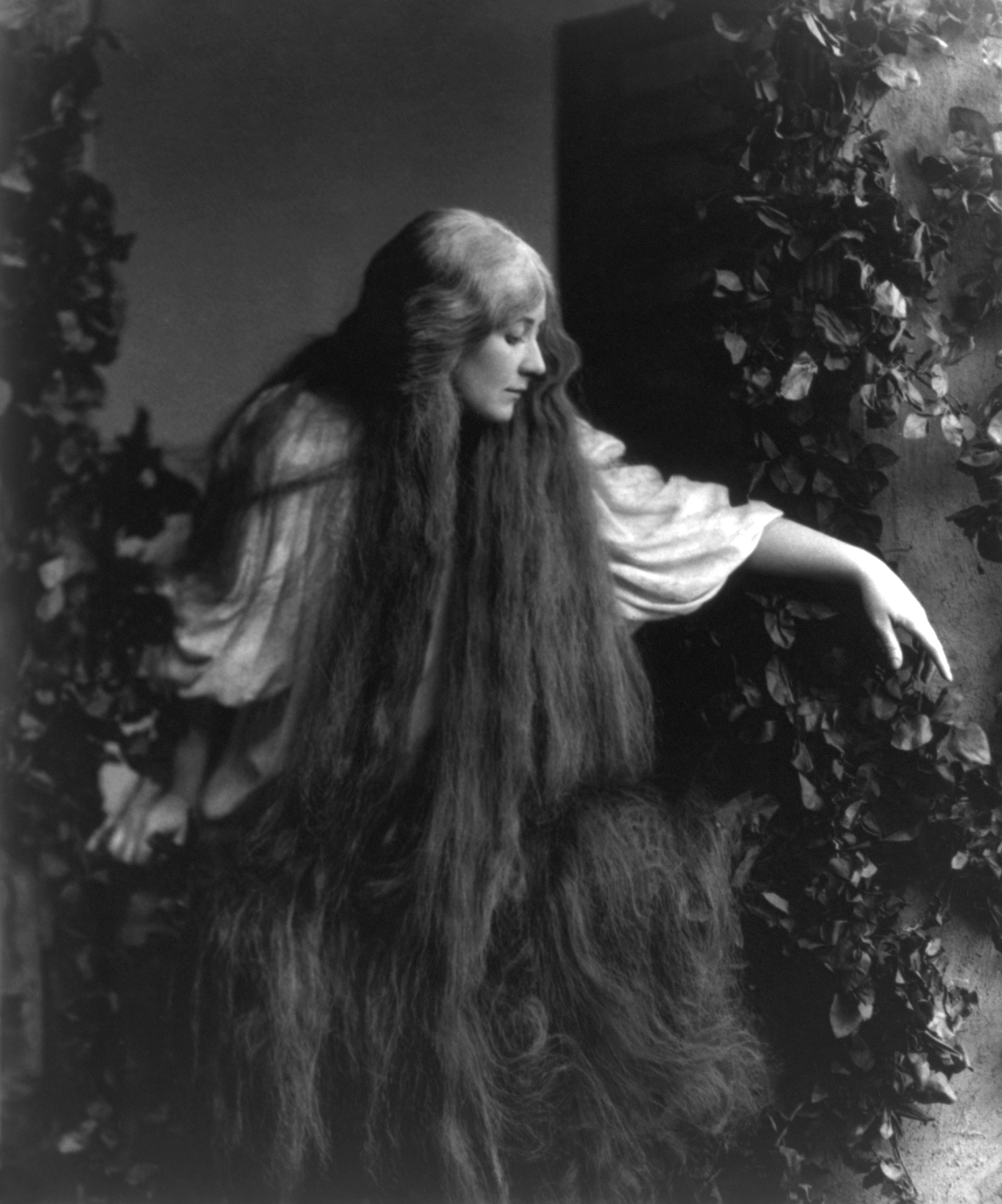
Mary Garden as Mélisande

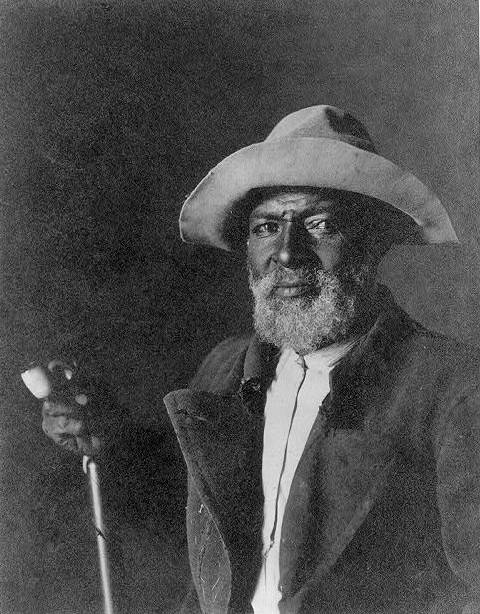
Uncle Essick

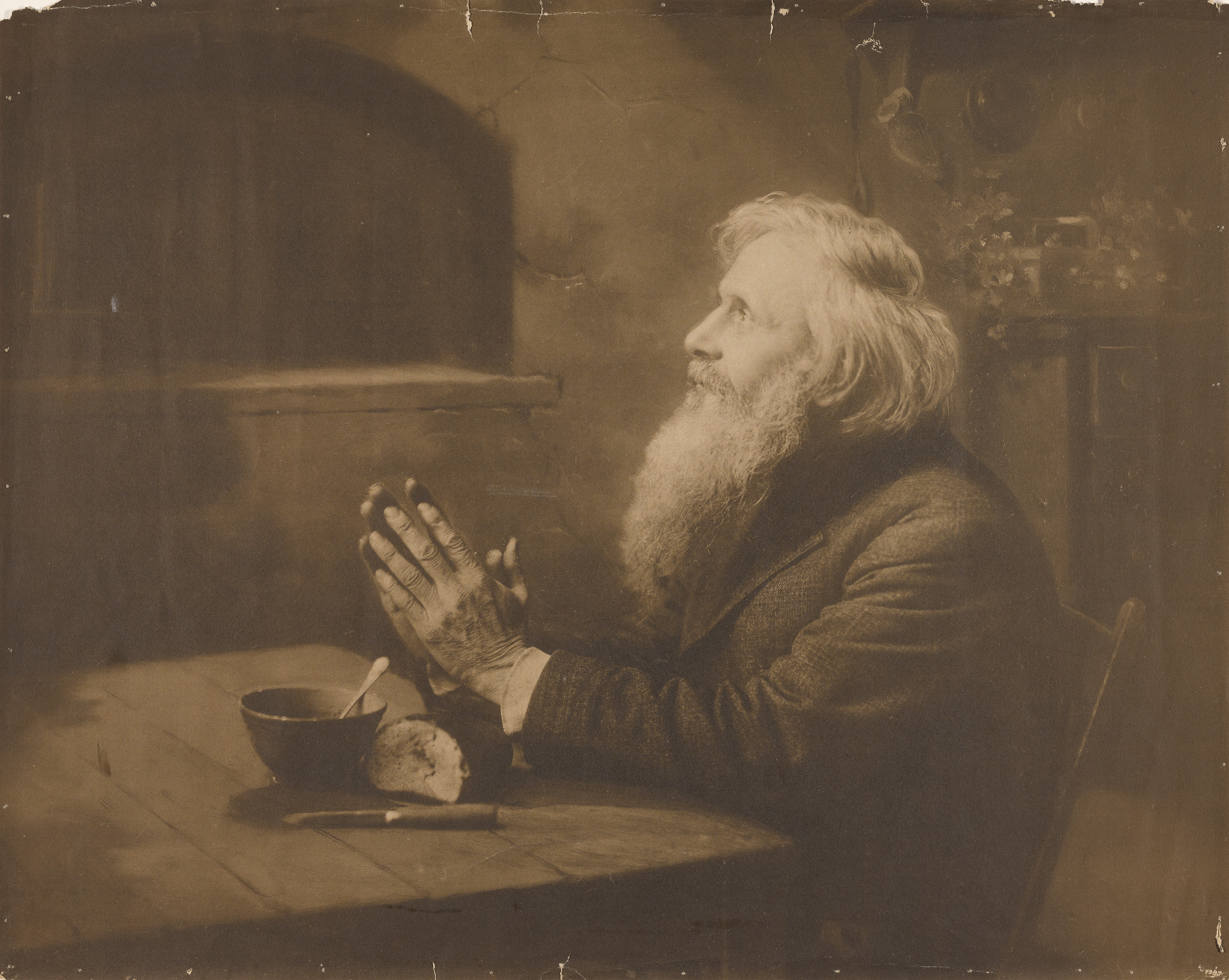
Man praying over meal
