= The Open Book (play) =

1920 play by Philip Bartholomae

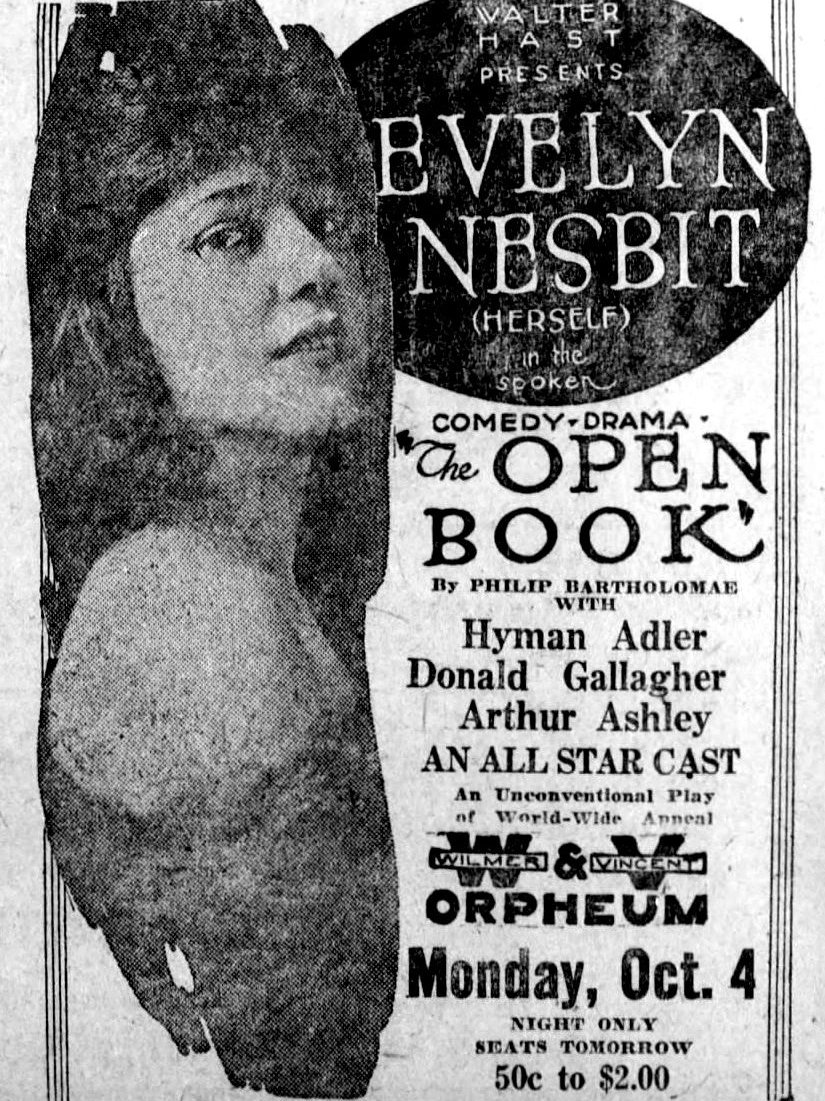
- Poster for The Open Book c. 1920
- Original language: English
- Written by: Philip Bartholomae
- Genre: Dramedy

Premiere
- Date: September 27, 1920
- Place: Belasco Theatre; Washington, D.C.

The Open Book is a three-act play written by American playwright Philip Bartholomae. The play premiered on September 27, 1920 at the Belasco Theatre in Washington, D.C. starring Evelyn Nesbit as Emily Martens.

== Production history ==
Described as a "musicless play" by The New York Times, the piece was originally conceived as a vaudeville sketch by Hyman Adler. After attempting to tour it on the vaudeville circuit to minimal success, he retooled the idea with writer Philip Bartholomae into a drama. On June 30, 1920, the New York Clipper reported that Evelyn Nesbit had been cast as the lead of the three-act play, with Hyman Adler featured in a supporting role. The play was announced to premiere at the Belasco Theatre in Washington, D.C. by the New York Times on August 9, 1920. Arthur Ashley was initially part of the company, but after opening night, Nesbit told producer Walter Hast that she refused to work with him over his allegiance to the Actors' Fidelity League, a craft union opposing Actors' Equity Association. He was, as a result, let go after opening night at the Belasco Theatre. Advertised as a vehicle for Nesbit, the show played multiple out-of-town-tryout performances at the Grand Opera House in Wilkes-Barre, the Orpheum Theater, the Lyceum Theatre in Ithaca, the Stone Opera House in Binghamton, and the Wieting Opera House, before a hopeful Broadway opening. The play closed in Syracuse after Nesbit departed the tour. Nesbit was replaced in her role by company member Beth Varden, and a press release was prepared by Adler reporting that she was too "ill" to continue her work with the show. However, after Adler found out she had quit the tour permanently, the press release was edited to cite her as being too “temperamental" to work with, as well as alluding to bad reviews she had garnered in the role. In an interview with Broadway Brevities in December 1920, Nesbit denied both claims, and said her reason for departing was the writing of the play itself. In a review for the New York Clipper, Nesbit's performance in the show was singled out, noting that "she carries out her big scenes very well," praising her "real ability" to enact the plays harsher moments, including her character committing suicide in a club after a fight with an unbalanced woman. Despite company member Beth Varden being promoted to replace Nesbit, the show closed in Syracuse the Saturday following her departure.

== Cast ==
Other members of the cast included Donald Gallaher, Hyman Adler, Edith Gresham, Grace Canfield, Leonard Ide, Burr Caruth, Lillian Paige, Helen Freeburn, J. Casler West, Charles Glocker, Andrew D. Molony, Edna Whitney, Mabel Allan, and Beth Varden.
