= The Woman Who Gave =

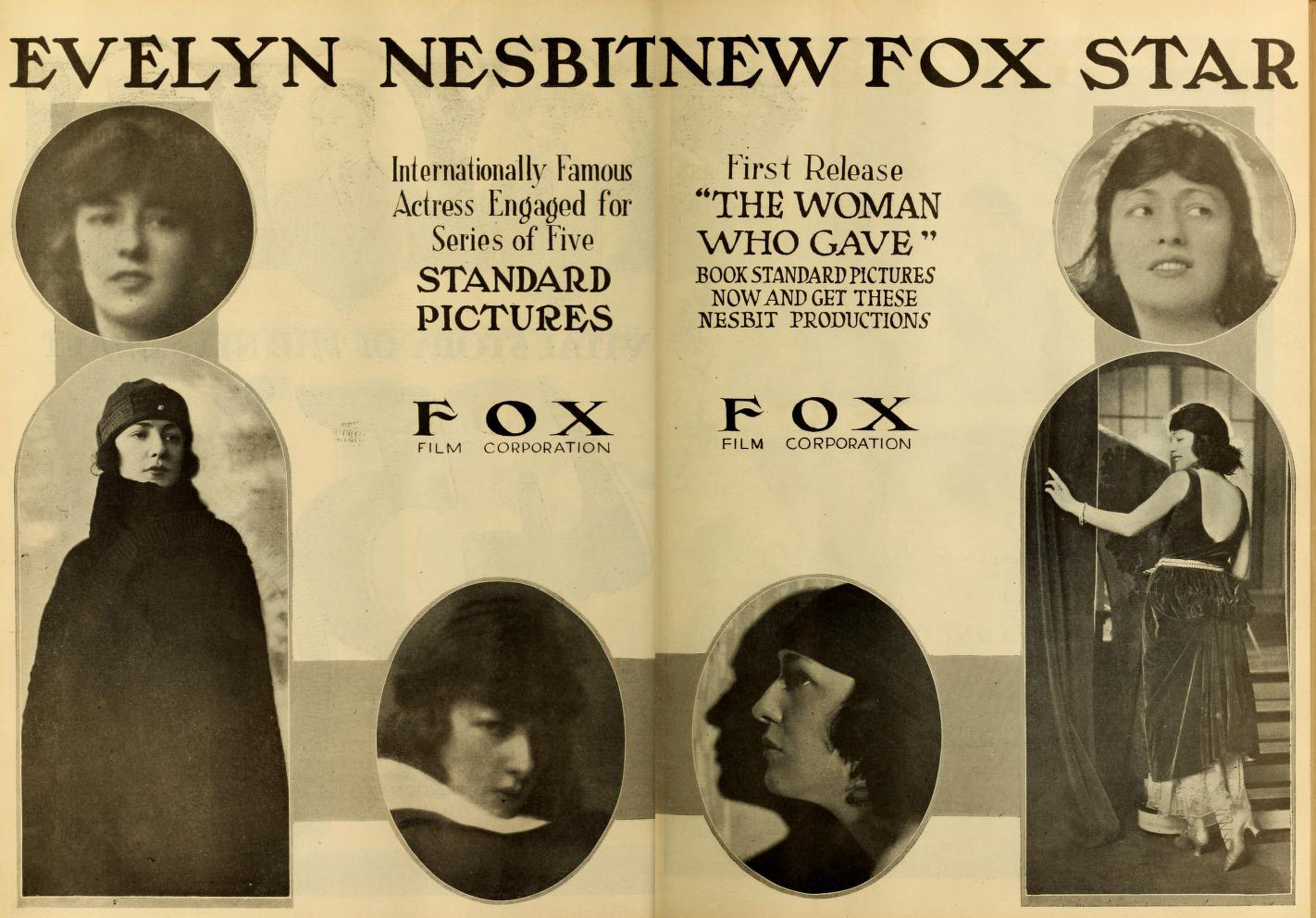
- press materials
- Directed by: Kenean Buel
- Written by: Izola Forrester (story); Mann Page (story); Kenean Buel (scenario)
- Produced by: William Fox
- Starring: Evelyn Nesbit
- Cinematography: Joseph Ruttenberg
- Distributed by: Fox Film Corporation
- Release date: November 10, 1918
- Running time: 6 reels
- Country: United States
- Language: Silent (English intertitles)

The Woman Who Gave is a lost 1918 American silent melodrama film directed by Kenean Buel and starring Evelyn Nesbit. The film was produced and distributed by the Fox Film Corporation. The film went into release the day before fighting in World War I ended.

== Cast ==
- Evelyn Nesbit as Colette
- Irving Cummings as Adrien Walcott
- Robert Walker as Don Walcott
- Eugene Ormonde as Prince Vacarra
- Dorothy Walters as Delia Picard
- Russell Thaw (Nesbit's son) as Rudolph

== Reception ==
Like many American films of the time, The Woman Who Gave was subject to restrictions and cuts by city and state film censorship boards. For example, the Chicago Board of Censors required a cut, in Reel 1, of the intertitle "Colette is not that kind", the entire struggle incident including closeups of a man suggestively leering at a young woman, the woman's look of fear, the dragging of the woman towards the bedroom, and the two intertitles "Let me go or I'll kill myself" and "You are mine and there is no escape", in Reel 2, all closeups of men at a table looking salaciously at a young semi-nude woman on the table, the first and third scenes of the semi-nude woman on the table and a flash repetition of it in the second scene, and, in Reel 4, a man pulling the gown off of a woman's shoulder and kissing her.

== See also ==
- 1937 Fox vault fire
