= Redemption (1917 film) =

1917 film

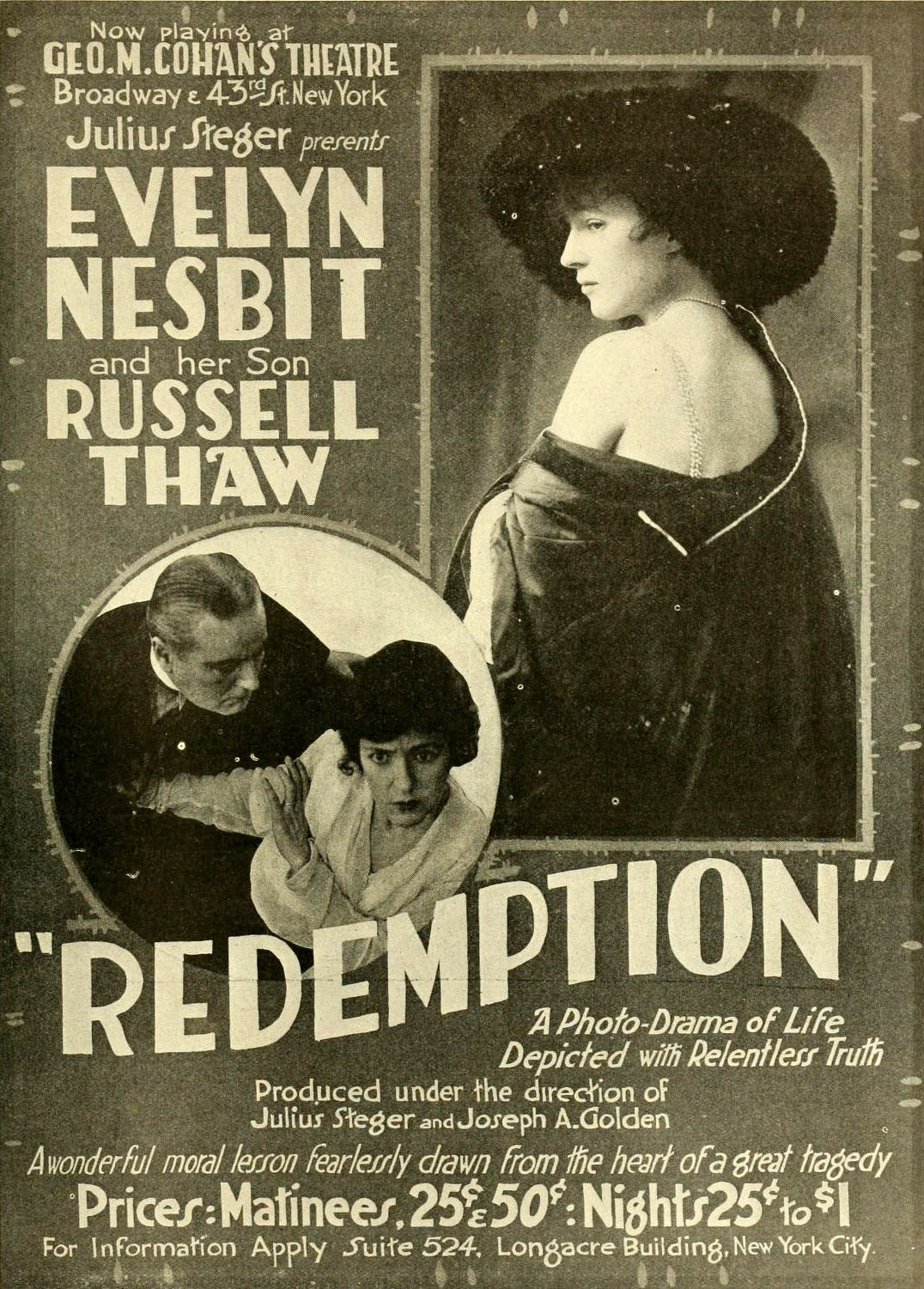
- Directed by: Julius Steiger; Joseph A. Golden
- Written by: John Stanton (scenario); Julius Steiger (intertitles)
- Produced by: Triumph Film Corporation; Julius Steiger
- Starring: Evelyn Nesbit; Russell Thaw
- Cinematography: John Urie
- Distributed by: Triumph Film Corporation
- Release date: June 2, 1917
- Running time: 60 minutes; 6 reels
- Country: United States
- Language: Silent (English intertitles)

Redemption is a lost 1917 American silent drama film starring Evelyn Nesbit. It was co-directed by Joseph A. Golden and Julius Steiger. The story depicted in the film has strong similarities to Nesbit's own scandalous public life. Nesbit's young son Russell Thaw co-stars with her.

== Cast ==
- Evelyn Nesbit as Alice Loring (credited as Evelyn Nesbit Thaw)
- Russell Thaw as Harry Loring
- Charles Wellesley as Stephen Brooks (credited as Charles Wellsley)
- Mary Hall as Brooks's wife
- William Clark as Robert, Their Son (credited as William Clarke)
- Joyce Fair as Grace, Their Daughter
- Edward Lynch as Thomas Loring
- George Clarke as Harry (15 years later)
- Marie Reichardt as Mrs. Collins
