= The Hidden Woman =

1922 film by Allan Dwan

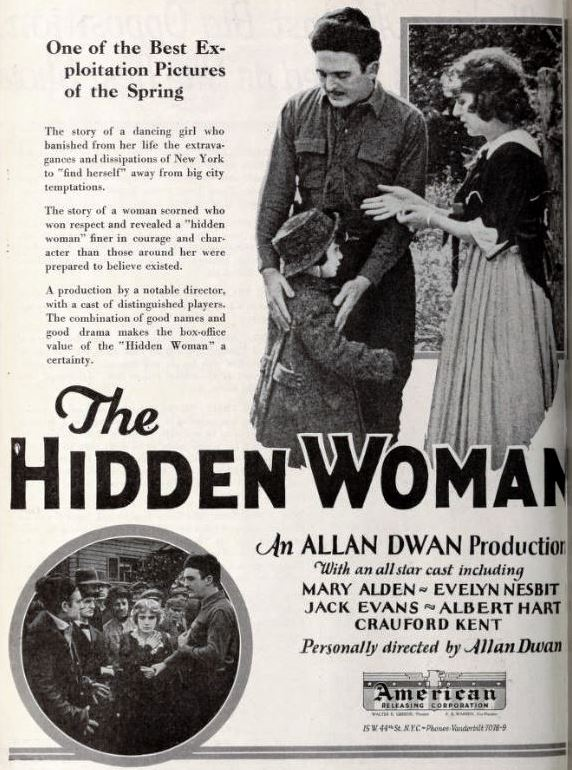
- Advertisement
- Directed by: Allan Dwan
- Produced by: Nanuet Amusement Corporation; Allan Dwan
- Starring: Evelyn Nesbit
- Distributed by: American Releasing Corporation
- Release date: April 2, 1922
- Running time: 5 reels
- Country: United States
- Language: Silent (English intertitles)

The Hidden Woman is a lost 1922 American silent drama film directed by Allan Dwan and starring Evelyn Nesbit in her final full-length feature film. The film was claimed to be made in 1916 and not released until 1922, but this is impossible since Anne Shirley is a cast member and she was born in 1918. Nesbit's son, Russell Thaw, has a role in the film.

== Cast ==
- Evelyn Nesbit as Ann Wesley
- Crauford Kent as Bart Andrews
- Murdock MacQuarrie as Iron MacLoid
- Ruth Darling as Vera MacLoid
- Albert Hart as Bill Donovan (credited as Albert Hart)
- Russell Thaw as Johnny Randolph
- Mary Alden as Mrs. Randolph
- Jack Evans as The Derelict
- Anne Shirley as Girl (credited as Dawn O'Day)
