= Threads of Destiny (1914 film) =

1914 silent film directed Joseph W. Smiley

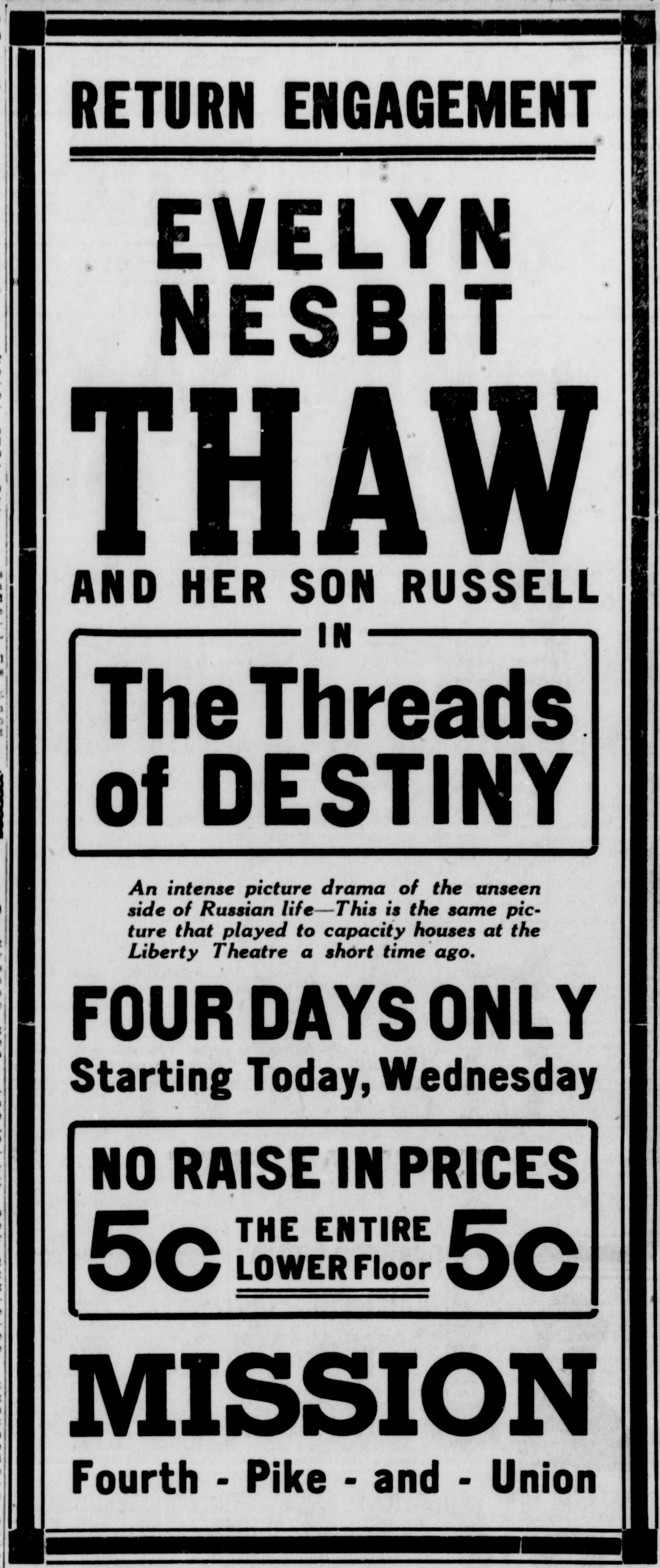
- Contemporary advertisement
- Directed by: Joseph W. Smiley
- Written by: William Clifford
- Produced by: Siegmund Lubin; Lubin Manufacturing Company
- Starring: Evelyn Nesbit
- Distributed by: General Film Company
- Release date: October 21, 1914 (U.S.)
- Running time: 5 reels
- Country: United States
- Language: Silent (English intertitles)

Threads of Destiny is a lost 1914 silent drama film directed by Joseph W. Smiley and starring Evelyn Nesbit, in her feature debut. It was produced by the Lubin Manufacturing Company and distributed by General Film Company.

== Cast ==
- Evelyn Nesbit as Miriam Gruenstein
- Bernard Siegel as Isaac Gruenstein
- Jack Clifford as Fedor Tomspky
- Margaret Risser as Rachel Shapiro
- William W. Cohill as Alexis Movak
- Joseph W. Smiley as Ivan Russak
- Russell Thaw as Russell, Fedor's son (credited as Russell William Thaw)
- Joseph Standish as Abraham Solman
- Marguerite Marsh as The Nun

== Preservation ==
With no holdings located in archives, Threads of Destiny is considered a lost film.
