= Unwritten Law (disambiguation) =

Unwritten Law is an American punk rock band.

Unwritten Law may also refer to:

== Law and society ==
- Oral law, a code of conduct transmitted by oral tradition
- Unspoken rule, a type of social norm
- Unwritten law (Ireland), landholding traditions in Ireland not recognized by law

== Film ==
- The Unwritten Law (1907 film), an American true crime short film produced by Siegmund Lubin
- The Unwritten Law (1916 film), an American silent drama film produced by the California Motion Picture Corporation
- The Unwritten Law (1922 film), a German silent drama film directed by Carl Boese
- The Unwritten Law (1925 film), an American silent crime melodrama film directed by Edward LeSaint
- The Unwritten Law (1929 film), a British crime short film directed by Sinclair Hill
- The Unwritten Law (1932 film), an American mystery film directed by Christy Cabanne
- The Unwritten Law (1985 film), a Hong Kong drama film directed by Ng See-yuen

== Music ==
- Unwritten Law (album), by Unwritten Law, 1998
- "Unwritten Law", a song by the Sound from Jeopardy, 1980
- "The Unwritten Law", a song by Deep Purple from The House of Blue Light, 1987

== Other uses ==
- Unwritten Law, a 1913 play by Edwin Milton Royle; basis for the 1916 film
- "The Unwritten Law Caper", a 1946 episode of the radio series The Adventures of Sam Spade
