= Russell Thaw =

American test pilot (1910–1984)

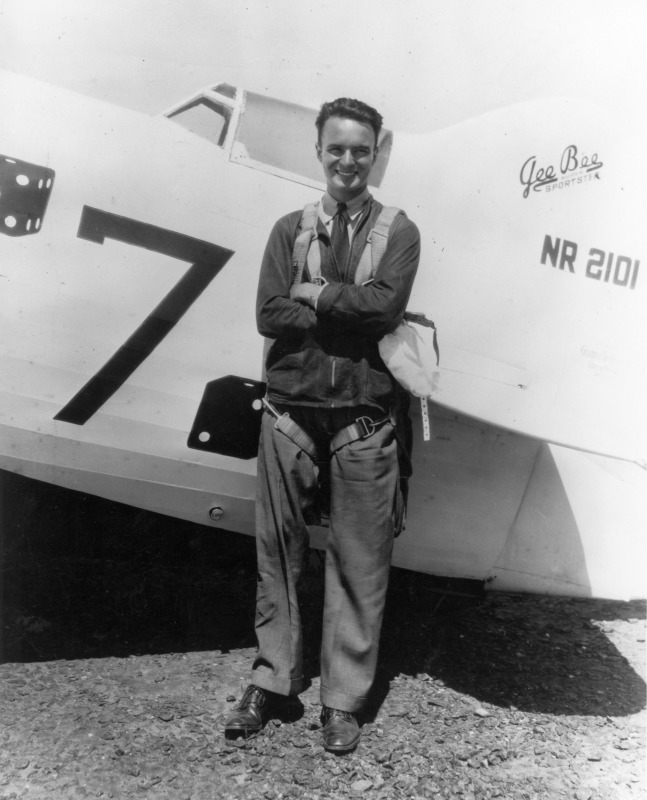
- Born: October 25, 1910; Berlin, German Empire
- Died: May 6, 1984 (aged 73); Santa Barbara, California, U.S.
- Spouses: Katherine Emily Roberts (m. 1936; div. 1941); Barbara Hall (m. 1943)
- Children: 3
- Parents: Harry Kendall Thaw; Evelyn Nesbit

Russell William Thaw (October 25, 1910 – May 6, 1984) was an American airplane pilot and childhood actor. While working as the chief pilot for the Guggenheim family, he was sponsored for air races and excursions. He served during World War II in the United States Army Air Force, and later became a test pilot for the Douglas Aircraft Company in California. In 1948 he was the first person to fly the Douglas XF3D-1.

Born in Germany to American parents, Thaw was the only child of Evelyn Nesbit, a famous Gibson Girl model and actress, and her first husband, the erratic millionaire Harry Kendall Thaw. Their lives had received sensational attention after Harry Thaw fatally shot the prominent New York architect Stanford White in 1906 in front of a large crowd at the Madison Square Garden rooftop theatre (four years before Russell Thaw was born). Harry Thaw spent the next several years in mental institutions before eventually being released. The Thaw family did not accept Nesbit's claims about Russell's paternity. He grew up in California, where his mother remarried after divorcing his father. She had a prominent and lucrative acting career, and Thaw appeared as a child actor with his mother in six films of the silent film era, all of which have since been lost.

== Early years ==
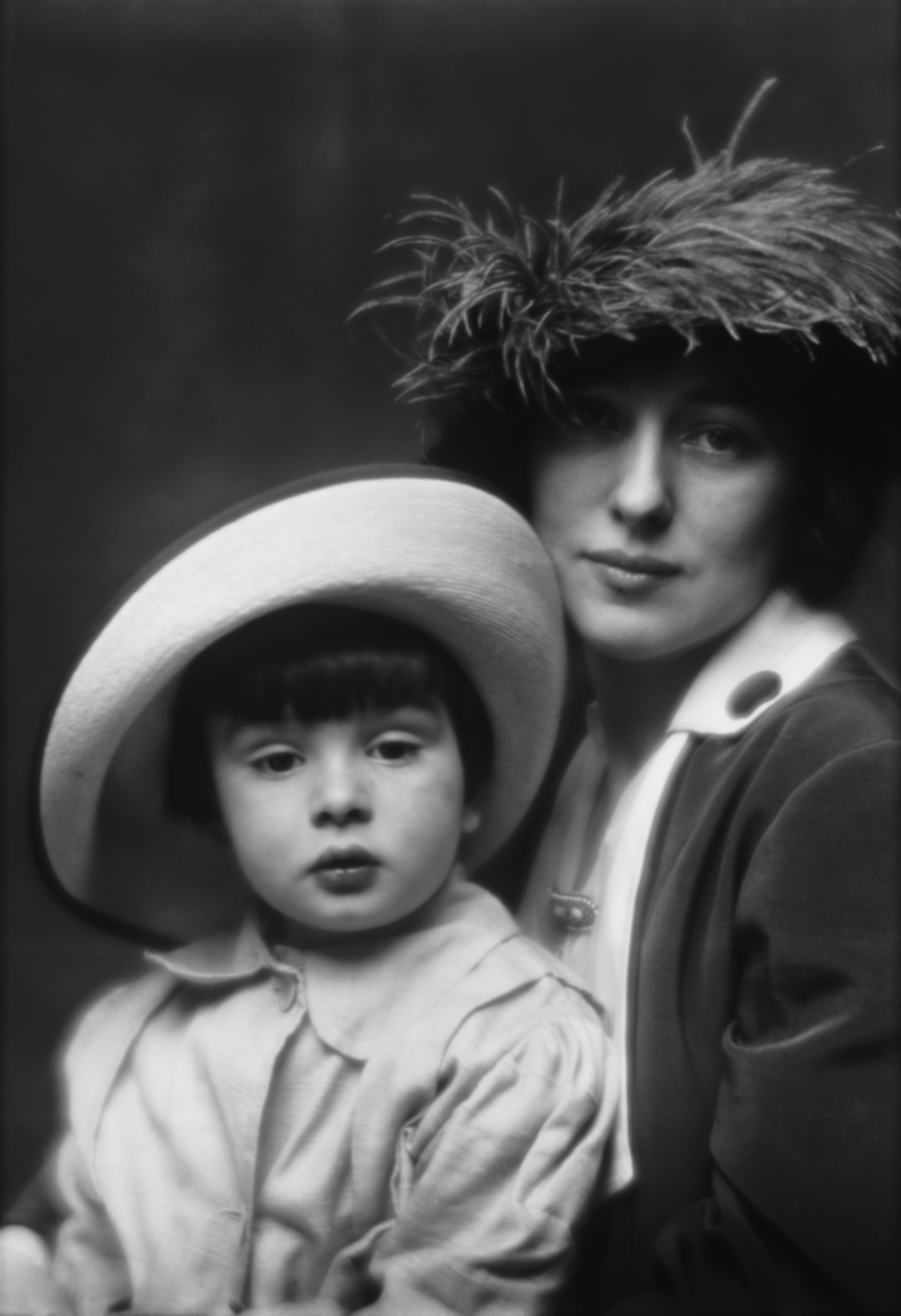
Thaw with his mother, aged 3

Born in Berlin, Germany, in 1910, Thaw was the only known child of Evelyn Nesbit, a famous American model and actress, and her first legally binding husband Harry Kendall Thaw. The senior Thaw was wealthy, the son of a Pittsburgh railroad and coal tycoon, with a long history of mental instability. In 1906 at Madison Square Garden in front of hundreds of witnesses, he shot and killed architect Stanford White, whom he later accused of drugging and raping Nesbit when she was 16 years old. In 1908 Harry Thaw was acquitted of murder based on reason of insanity, but he spent years in mental institutions, where Nesbit visited him.

Russell Thaw was treated indifferently by Harry Thaw and his family, who never accepted the boy as his biological son. Russell was born four years into a period of about seven years, following his father's killing of White, when Harry Kendall Thaw was largely confined to jails and mental institutions. Nesbit had testified that Russell had been conceived by Harry Thaw during her conjugal visits to her husband at the Matteawan State Hospital for the Criminally Insane. There Harry Thaw had been given extensive visitation privileges, freedom of movement, and privacy. Nesbit said that those who saw the boy believed that Harry Thaw was his father due to the resemblance between them. She eventually gave up trying to prove Thaw's paternity in an era before it could definitively be established. Nesbit said of the matter, "A working girl could not fight the Thaw millions."

Nesbit and Harry Kendall Thaw divorced in 1915, after she had moved to California with Russell. She married again in 1916, to Jack Clifford. His father was eventually released, though a kidnapping and sexual assault charge saw him briefly confined again, before being released due to his family connections.

As a child, Thaw appeared with his mother in at least six films of the silent film era: Threads of Destiny (1914), Redemption (1917), Her Mistake (1918), The Woman Who Gave (1918), I Want to Forget (1918), and The Hidden Woman (1922). However, all copies of these films have since been lost.

== Career as a pilot ==
As a young man Thaw was attracted to flying and became certified as a pilot. He worked as the chief pilot for the Guggenheim family and participated in air races and adventure excursions under their sponsorship.

Thaw participated in two cross-country Bendix trophy races. These were instituted in 1931 and held annually to promote and encourage the achievements of U.S. aviation. Flying the Gee Bee Model R-2 with a Pratt & Whitney Wasp engine, he withdrew from the 1933 race. Flying a Northrop Gamma with a Wright Cyclone engine, he came in third in the 1935 race from Los Angeles to Cleveland, ahead of Amelia Earhart in fifth place.

On December 10, 1935, Thaw crashed in Atlanta, after leaving from Caldwell, New Jersey, during a planned flight to rescue the polar explorer Lincoln Ellsworth.

He also served as a pilot in the US Army Air Force during World War II.

Thaw worked as a test pilot for the Douglas Aircraft Company. He flew the Douglas F3D Skyknight, the Douglas XB-43 Jetmaster, and the XF4D-1 Skyray. He was the first person to fly the Douglas XF3D-1 (on March 23, 1948, at Douglas's El Segundo facility in California).

== Personal life ==
On July 17, 1936, Thaw married Katherine Emily Roberts, a Beverly Hills debutante who was a graduate of Radcliffe College. They settled in White Plains, New York. They separated on March 15, 1939. Katherine Thaw sued her husband for cruelty and "refusal to live with her". They divorced effective July 8, 1941. Katherine Thaw said that her husband had left her because he said he could not support them both.

Thaw married again in 1942. He and Barbara Hall had three children: sons Michael William and Russell Hall Thaw, who became an attorney, and a daughter, Theresa Nesbit Thaw. Thaw died in Santa Barbara, California, on May 6, 1984.
