= The Unwritten Law (1907 film) =

American film

The Unwritten Law: A Thrilling Drama Based on the Thaw-White Tragedy
- Produced by: Siegmund Lubin
- Production company: Lubin Manufacturing Company
- Release date: March 2, 1907
- Running time: 12 min.
- Country: United States

The Unwritten Law: A Thrilling Drama Based on the Thaw-White Case is a 1907 film produced by the Lubin Manufacturing Company in the true crime genre, about American coal and railroad baron Harry Kendall Thaw's killing of architect Stanford White over his involvement with model and actress Evelyn Nesbit. Produced and released concurrently with Thaw's trial, its depiction of a recent sexual scandal led to widespread controversy, becoming "the first film in the United States to be widely construed as 'scandalous'".

== Plot ==
The plot closely follows Nesbit's own testimony regarding White's seduction and assault, followed by a scene of the killing and Thaw's imprisonment in New York prison The Tombs. Finally, the film shows Thaw's acquittal, though in reality, he had not yet been acquitted at the time of the film's release.

== Reception ==
The film was denounced in the motion picture press and banned in several cities.

In his book Policing Cinema: Movies and Censorship in Early-Twentieth Century America, film scholar Lee Grieveson situates the film within the broader discourse on sexuality, morality, and cinema in the United States.
