= George C. Cox =

American photographer (1851–1903)

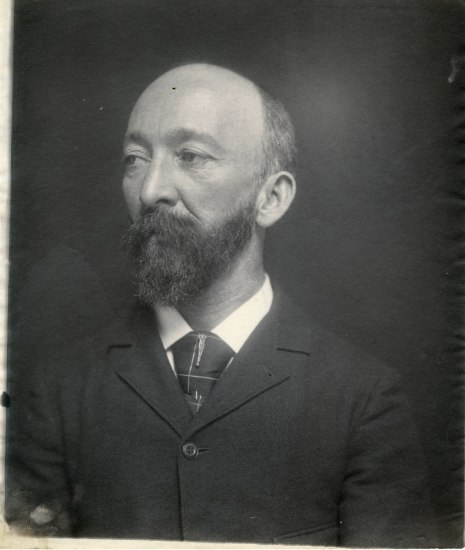
- Self-portrait of Cox, dating to the early 1890s.
- Born: 1851; United States
- Died: 1903 (aged 51–52); United States
- Known for: portraitist
- Notable work: notable for his portraits of Walt Whitman and Henry Ward Beecher.

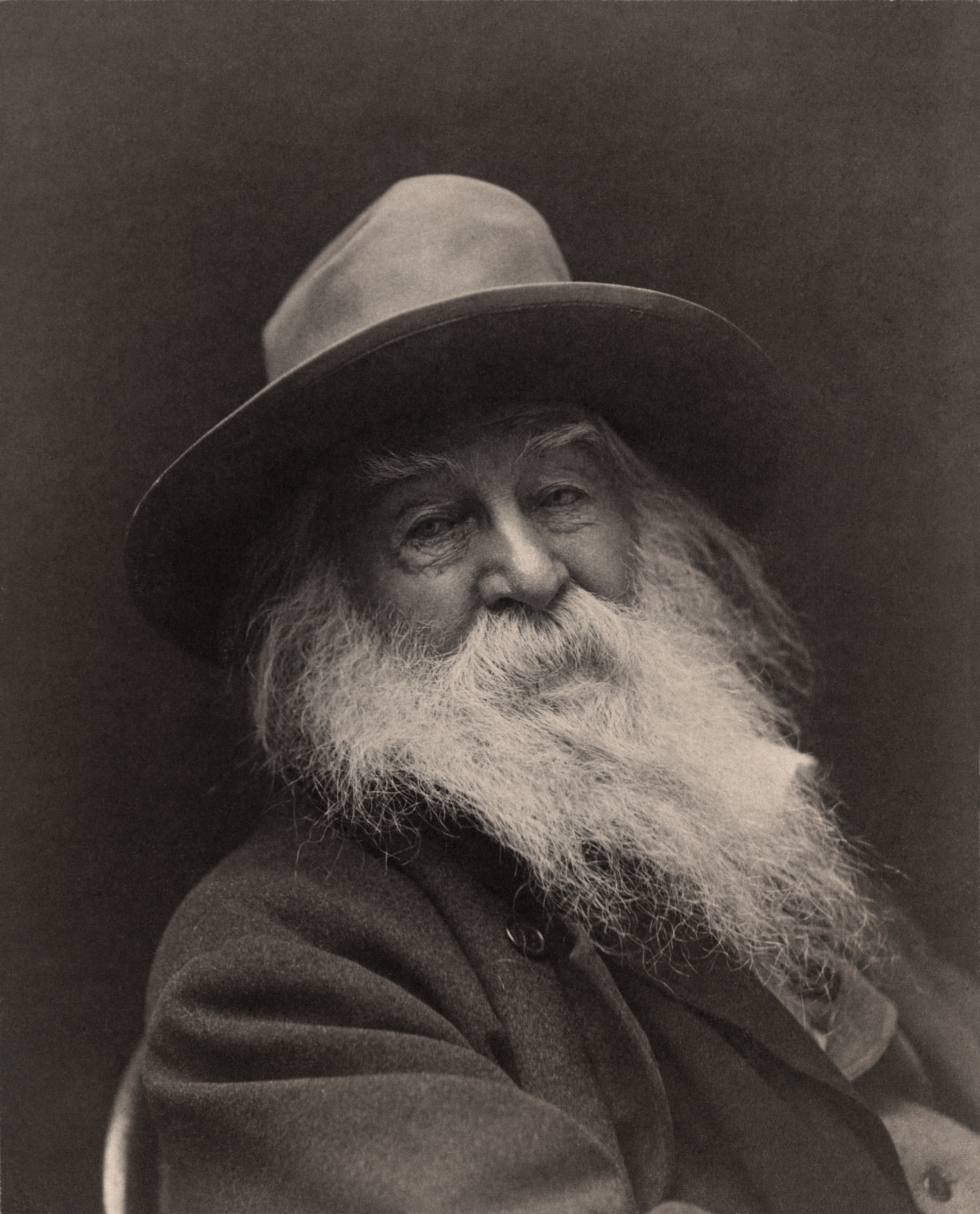
An 1887 portrait of Walt Whitman by Cox

George Collins Cox (1851–1903) was an American photographer, notable for his portraits of Walt Whitman and Henry Ward Beecher.
