= Thaw (name) =

Thaw is a surname from multiple convergent origins. One purposed origin is as an anglicized derivative of the Nordic name Thor. Another origin is as an anglicization of the German Ashkenazi surname Thau. It may also be a variant of Thew, coming from a Middle English nickname for someone with good manners. The surname's presence in Scotland has been attributed to a Scots origin for the name as well.

Thaw can also be found as part of Burmese and Karenic names in Myanmar, where hereditary surnames are not customary. Some of those bearing the name Thaw have adopted it as a surname upon immigrating to places where hereditary surnames are commonplace.

Notable people with the name include:

- Abigail Thaw (born 1965), English actress
- Alan Thaw (1926–2007), Australian rules football player
- Alexander Blair Thaw (1898–1918), American military aviator
- Alice Cornelia Thaw (1880–1955), American philanthropist and countess
- Aung Thaw (born 1920), Burmese archaeologist
- Ba Thaw (1928–1991), Burmese politician
- Baganset U Thaw (1893–1980), Burmese businessman and politician
- Benjamin Thaw Sr. (1859–1933), American banker
- Eugene V. Thaw (1927–2018), American art dealer
- Evelyn Nesbit Thaw (c. 1884–1967), American actor and model
- Florence Thaw (1864–1940), American painter
- Harry Kendall Thaw (1871–1947), American murderer
- John Thaw (1942–2002), English actor
- Kevin Thaw (born 1967), British rock climber
- Margaret Copley Thaw (1877–1942), American socialite and philanthropist
- Mary Sibbet Copley Thaw (1843–1929), American philanthropist
- May Barani Thaw (born 1990), Burmese model and actor
- Mya Thaw (born 1955), Burmese dental professor
- Nyein Thaw (born 1993), Burmese actor and model
- Phyo Zeya Thaw (1981–2022), Burmese politician and rapper
- Russell Thaw (1910–1984), American pilot and child actor
- Samuel Thaw Walton (1943–2002), American football player
- San Thaw Thaw (born 2001), Burmese soccer player
- Thant Thaw Kaung (born 1969), Burmese publisher and library advocate
- Thaw Kaung (born 1937), Burmese academic
- William Thaw Sr. (1818–1889), American businessman
- William Thaw II (1893–1934), American combat aviator
- Win Thinzar Thaw (born 1997), birth name of Burmese actor Patricia

== See also ==
- Thaw (disambiguation)
- Helga Schultze, married name Helga Hösl-Thaw
