= Thaw =

Thaw or THAW may refer to:

- Thawing or melting
- Thaw (weather), the melting of snow and ice

== Film and television ==
- The Thaw (1931 film), a Soviet film
- The Thaw (2009 film), an American horror film starring Val Kilmer
- "The Thaw" (Star Trek: Voyager), a 1996 episode of Star Trek Voyager
- The Thaw (Russian TV series), a 2013 Russian television series
- The Thaw (Polish TV series), a 2022 Polish television series
- Zagar Pyaw Thaw Athe Hnalone, a 1968 Burmese black & white drama film

== Geography ==
- River Thaw, a river in south Wales, United Kingdom
- Thaw Hill, a cinder cone in British Columbia, Canada
- Thaw lake, a lake formed in a thermokarst

== Literature ==
- The Thaw (novel), a 1954 novel by Ilya Ehrenburg
- The Thaw (novelette), a 1979 novelette by Tanith Lee

== Music ==
- Thaw (Foetus album) (1988)
- Thaw, a 2014 album by Buckethead

== Games ==
- Tony Hawk's American Wasteland, a skateboarding video game

== Political developments ==
- Cuban thaw, warming of Cuba–United States relations that began in 2014
- Gomułka thaw, Polish thaw or Polish October, a political change in Poland in 1956
- Khrushchev Thaw, a period in the history of the Soviet Union from the mid-1950s to the mid-1960s

== Other uses ==
- Theaters Against War, a coalition of theaters and theater artists protesting against the Iraq war
- The Heat and Warmth Fund, a nonprofit organization in Michigan providing energy assistance
- Thaw Hall, historic academic building at the University of Pittsburgh, United States
- "The Thaw Session", a jam session by the English rock band The Verve

== People ==
=== Surname ===
- Alan Thaw (1926–2007), Australian rules footballer
- Alice Cornelia Thaw (1880–1955), American philanthropist (daughter of William Thaw Sr. and Mary Sibbet Copley)
- Abigail Thaw (born 1965), British actress (daughter of John Thaw)
- Benjamin Thaw Sr. (1859–1933), American banker and philanthropist (son of William Thaw Sr., father of William Thaw II)
- Eugene V. Thaw (1927-2018), American art dealer and collector
- Evelyn Nesbit (c. 1884–1967), also known as Evelyn Nesbit Thaw, artists' model and actress (married Harry Kendall Thaw 1905, div. 1915, mother of Russell Thaw)
- Florence Thaw (1864–1940), American painter
- Harry Kendall Thaw (1871–1947), American heir found not guilty of murder by reason of insanity (son of William Thaw Sr. and Mary Sibbet Copley, husband of Evelyn Nesbit, father of Russell Thaw)
- John Thaw (1942–2002), English actor (father of Abigail Thaw)
- Kevin Thaw (born 1967), English alpinist
- Margaret Copley Thaw (1877–1942), American philanthropist (daughter of William Thaw Sr. and Mary Sibbet Copley)
- Mary Sibbet Copley (1943–1929), also known as Mary Sibbet Copley Thaw, American philanthropist (second wife of William Thaw Sr., mother of Alice Cornelia Thaw, Margaret Copley Thaw, and Harry Kendall Thaw)
- Russell Thaw (1910–1984), American racing pilot (son of Harry Kendall Thaw and Evelyn Nesbit)
- William Thaw Sr. (1818–1889), American railroad baron (husband of Mary Sibbet Copley, father of Alice Cornelia Thaw, Benjamin Thaw, Harry Kendall Thaw, and Margaret Copley Thaw)
- William Thaw II (1893–1934), American aviator who fought in World War I

=== Burmese names ===
- Aung Thaw (born c. 1920), Burmese archaeologist
- Baganset U Thaw (1893–1980), Burmese businessman, trader, administrator, and politician
- Maung Thaw Ka, pen name of author and retired Major Ba Thaw
- May Barani Thaw (born 1990), Burmese super model, actress and beauty pageant titleholder who was crowned Miss Universe
- Mya Thaw (born 1955), Burmese dental professor (father of Zayar Thaw)
- Nyein Thaw (born 1993), Burmese actor and model
- San Thaw Thaw (born 2001), Burmese footballer
- Thaw Kaung, Burmese university librarian
- Zayar Thaw (1981–2022), Burmese politician, hip-hop artist, and political activist (son of Mya Thaw)

== See also ==
- Thor (disambiguation)
