= The Girl in the Red Velvet Swing =

1955 American film directed by Richard Fleischer

- Theatrical release poster
- Directed by: Richard Fleischer
- Written by: Walter Reisch; Charles Brackett
- Produced by: Charles Brackett
- Starring: Ray Milland; Joan Collins; Farley Granger
- Cinematography: Milton R. Krasner
- Edited by: William Mace
- Music by: Leigh Harline
- Distributed by: 20th Century-Fox
- Release date: October 1, 1955
- Running time: 109 minutes
- Country: United States
- Language: English
- Budget: $1.7 million
- Box office: $1.3 million (US)

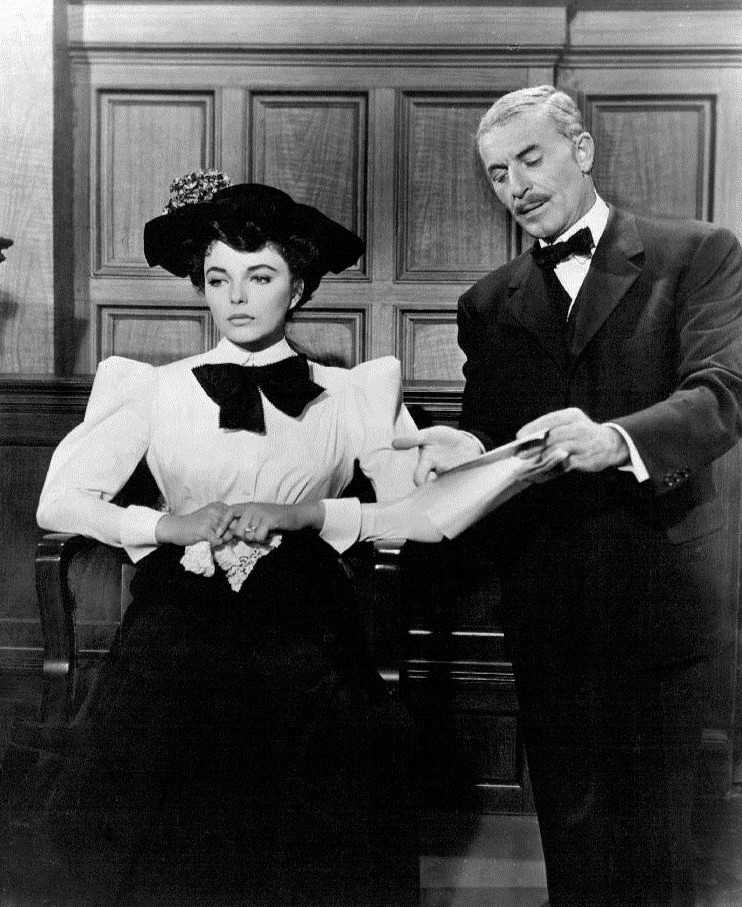
To save husband Harry Thaw from hanging, Evelyn Nesbit testifies in court under oath that Stanford White took advantage of her youth and drugged her.

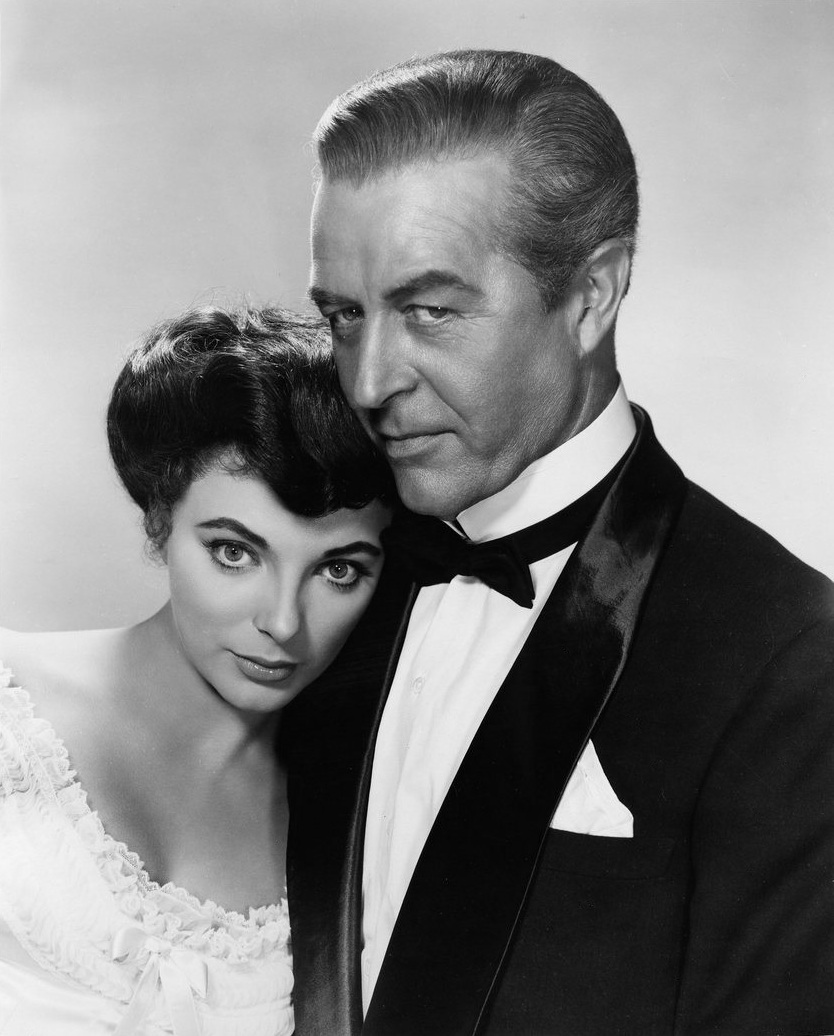
Joan Collins plays celebrated beauty Evelyn Nesbit, and Ray Milland plays famous architect Stanford White.

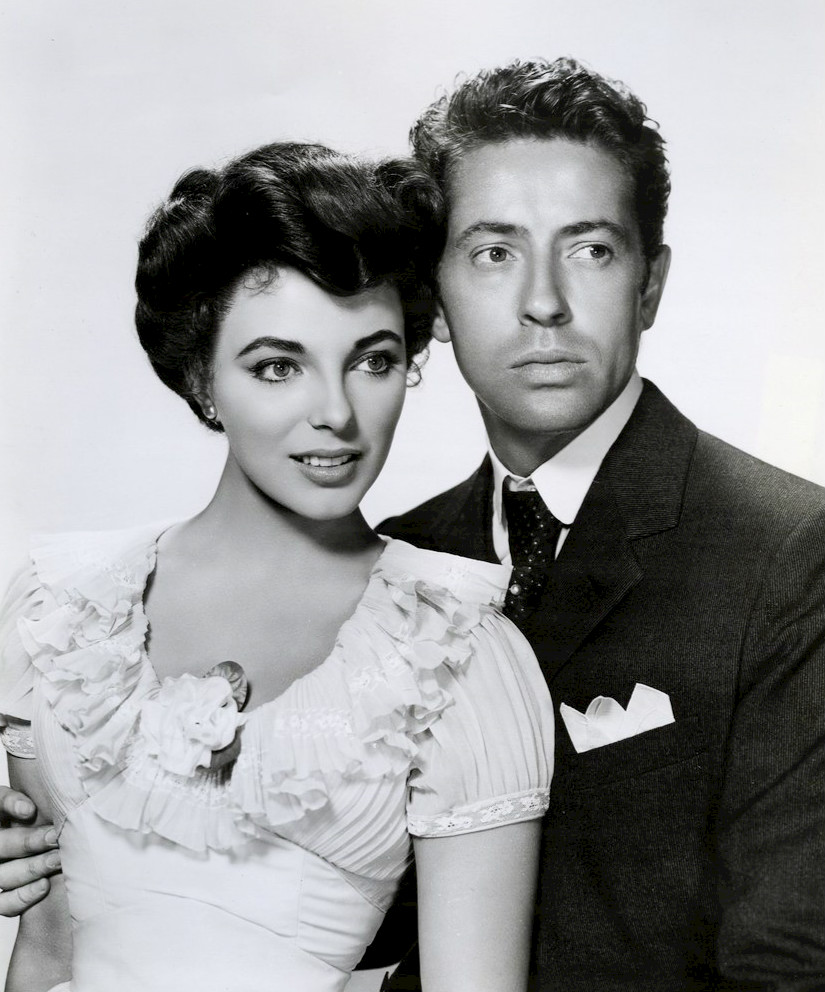
Joan Collins plays Evelyn Nesbit and Farley Granger plays Harry Thaw, her jealous multimillionaire husband who publicly kills Evelyn's former lover at the Madison Square Garden theatre.

The Girl in the Red Velvet Swing is a 1955 American crime melodrama film directed by Richard Fleischer from a screenplay by Walter Reisch and Charles Brackett, and starring Joan Collins, Ray Milland, and Farley Granger. It is based on the real-life scandal of model and actress Evelyn Nesbit (Collins), surrounding the June 1906 killing of her former paramour and alleged rapist, the prominent architect Stanford White (Milland), by her husband, the rail and coal heir Harry Kendall Thaw (Granger).

This was one of several films directed by Fleischer which dramatized real-life murder cases, he later directed Compulsion (1959, based on the Leopold and Loeb), The Boston Strangler (1968, based on the eponymous serial killer and apprehension of Albert DeSalvo), and 10 Rillington Place (1971, based on John Christie).

The Girl in the Red Velvet Swing was released by 20th Century Fox on October 1, 1955.

== Plot ==
June 1906, New York City. Arriving nearly two hours late for a dinner reservation, multimillionaire Harry Thaw is indignant that his imagined rival, prominent architect Stanford White, has been given his table. The detested White has a higher social status; worse, White blackballed Thaw from membership at an exclusive club.

Bobby Collier shows Stanford White and his wife, Bessie Springs Smith, an advance issue of a Colliers Weekly article on White's iconic architectural projects, including Madison Square Garden. The magazine cover has an illustration by Charles Dana Gibson of new "Gibson Girl", Evelyn Nesbit.

Teenaged Evelyn and her seamstress mother Mrs. Evelyn McKenzie Nesbit work on costumes for a theater production, which Evelyn supplements by $5 modeling fees. The stage manager arranges for the beautiful Evelyn to perform as a chorus girl in a production of the musical Florodora. Thaw brings presents for all the Floradora chorus, inviting the cast—singling out Evelyn—to be his guests the next day. However, through Gwen Arden, another Floradora girl, Evelyn meets Stanford White and instead attends White's party. Enchanted by Evelyn, 48-year-old White pays to have Evelyn's chipped tooth repaired by dentist Dr. Hollingshead but intends not to see Evelyn again, in deference to her youth and inexperience. When Mrs. Nesbit learns of the encounter, she forbids Evelyn to see the older married man again.

At a stag party, attended by both White and Thaw, Evelyn has been paid to jump out of a large pie, along with live birds. White pays to have another show girl jump out of the pie instead and takes Evelyn to his home. Frolicking in a room with a red velvet swing, they become lovers. Following Evelyn's actions, Thaw offers to buy Evelyn a fur coat and professes his love. Back from a trip, Mrs. Nesbit is upset that Evelyn has not been doing her modeling jobs. Evelyn refuses to be questioned, insisting she's not a child anymore. After meeting Mrs. Nesbit, White tells Evelyn that he will not divorce his wife; he wants Evelyn to prepare for a respectable life. White becomes Evelyn's guardian while Evelyn goes off to boarding school.

Meanwhile, Thaw finds out Evelyn's whereabouts, and finding her depressed and ill, takes Evelyn and Mrs. Nesbit away to Europe. Resisting Thaw's proposal, Evelyn informs him that her relationship with White was not innocent. Thaw slaps her, then subsequently apologizes to her. Believing his repentance sincere, Evelyn agrees to marry him. A jealous Thaw insists Dr. Hollingshead undo the repair to Evelyn's tooth done at White's expense. White turns up during Evelyn's treatment, urging Evelyn not to marry the insane Thaw. Evelyn insists she will marry Thaw.

During their honeymoon, an obsessed Thaw harries Evelyn for details of her affair with White, insisting on his own interpolations and interpretations. An unstable Thaw constantly demeans Evelyn and shoots a gun in the house. He insists that Evelyn must tell him that she has seen "the beast" when it inevitably happens.

Dining with friends, Evelyn spots White at a restaurant, and informs Thaw that White is there. Thaw insists the group leave for Madison Square Garden, where White later arrives. They start to leave, but Thaw instead confronts White, shooting him in the middle of the theater. Ejecting the bullets out of his gun, Thaw proclaims "I did it because he ruined my wife!"

Thaw's mother Mary Sibbet Copley Thaw hires attorney William Travers Jerome who has won all his 411 tried cases for a defense based on "the unwritten law" that Thaw was defending his wife's honor. Evelyn is pressured to testify under oath that White took advantage of her youth and drugged her. Mrs. Thaw insists that Thaw will be executed unless Evelyn saves him with her testimony. Evelyn testifies accordingly. The prosecutor attempts to discredit Evelyn by exposing her past, including financial support and gifts from White and leaving White for the richer Thaw. Ultimately, the jury finds Thaw not guilty due to insanity.

Evelyn assures Bessie White that her testimony did not reflect White's behavior. Ignoring Evelyn, Thaw leaves jail for the sanitorium, certain confinement will only be temporary. Thaw is treated like a celebrity by other inmates and the press. The Thaws offer Evelyn an allowance to disappear abroad, but Evelyn prefers an Atlantic City promoter's more "honest" offer to perform as herself, "The Girl in the Red Velvet Swing".

== Cast ==
- Ray Milland as Stanford White
- Joan Collins as Evelyn Nesbit Thaw
- Farley Granger as Harry Kendall Thaw
- Luther Adler as Delphin Delmas
- Cornelia Otis Skinner as Mary Sibbet Copley Thaw
- Glenda Farrell as Evelyn McKenzie Nesbit
- Frances Fuller as Elizabeth "Bessie" Springs Smith White
- Phillip Reed as Robert J. Collier
- Gale Robbins as Gwen Arden
- James Lorimer as McCaleb
- John Hoyt as William Travers Jerome
- Robert F. Simon as Stage Manager
- Harvey Stephens as Dr. Hollingshead
- Emile Meyer as Hunchbacher

Uncredited

- Raymond Bailey as Judge Thomas W. Fitzgerald
- Richard Travis as Charles Dana Gibson

== Historical background ==
The film dramatizes the 1906-1907 White-Thaw murder case, which was called the "trial of the century" at the time.

Stanford White was married and was 32 years older than Evelyn Nesbit, and he became her lover when she was 15 or 16 years old after allegedly giving her champagne and drugging and raping her in September 1901. Paula Uruburu, author of the non-fiction book American Eve, states that she believes Nesbit was born on December 25, 1885, and that Nesbit prominently celebrated her 18th birthday in 1903, but December 25, 1886, is also an oft-discussed alternative birth date. No clear birth record exists due to a fire, and Nesbit's mother would often add several years to Nesbit's age to circumvent child labor laws.

Thaw had later married Nesbit in 1905 after White and Nesbit were no longer lovers, and Thaw was ultimately acquitted of murder based on having been considered insane at the time of the killing. In the film, White (and Nesbit's mother Evelyn McKenzie Nesbit) are portrayed in a more positive light than what Nesbit described in court proceedings and in her memoir, and Thaw is introduced earlier in Nesbit's timeline than he was in life.

== Production ==
Writer Walter Reisch claimed the film was his idea; he said 20th Century Fox was enthusiastic in part because producer Charles Brackett knew Stanford White as a boy. Reisch estimated the film was 70% fact and 30% fictionalized. The filmmakers tracked down Evelyn Nesbit to get permission to make the film, and Nesbit agreed in exchange for money – although she was reluctant to do publicity for the film.

The film takes its title from Charles Samuels' 1953 biography of Nesbit, which was heavily criticized by Nesbit herself as sensationalist. Contemporary reporting suggested 20th Century Fox bought the film rights to the book only so they could use the title.

20th Century-Fox had originally planned to put Marilyn Monroe in the title role, then suspended her when she refused to do the film. Both Terry Moore and Debra Paget also tested for the part.

== Release ==
The film was released by Fox on October 1, 1955.

== See also ==
- Ragtime, a 1975 novel by E. L. Doctorow and a 1981 film also treating the story of Nesbit, Thaw, and White
