= Thew =

Thew may refer to:

- Thew (surname), a medieval English surname
- George Thew Burke (1776–1854), Canadian soldier, merchant and politician
- Henry Thew Stevenson (1870–1957), American writer
- Joshua Thew (born 1988), British ballet dancer
- Julian Thew (born 1967), British poker player
- Linda McCullough Thew (born 1918), British author
- Daniel Thew Wright (1864–1943), American judge
