= Shurtliff =

Shurtliff is a surname. Notable people with the surname include:

- Laurence Shurtliff (1945–2006), American music executive and roadie
- LaWanna Shurtliff (1935–2020), American politician
- Lewis W. Shurtliff (1835–1922), American politician and Mormon missionary and leader

== See also ==
- Shurtleff
