= Shurtleff =

Shurtleff is an English surname. Notable people with the surname include:

- Arthur Shurtleff (1870–1957), American urban planner
- Bert Shurtleff (1897–1967), National Football League player in the 1920s
- Edward D. Shurtleff (1863–1936), American jurist and politician
- Mark Shurtleff (born 1957), former attorney general of Utah
- Michael Shurtleff (1920–2007), actor and casting director
- Nathaniel B. Shurtleff (1810–1874), politician and 20th mayor of Boston, Massachusetts
- Roswell Morse Shurtleff (1838–1915), American painter and illustrator
- William Lewis Shurtleff (1864–1954), attorney for Harry Kendall Thaw
- William Shurtleff (born 1941), American writer about soy foods
- Logan Shurtleff (born 2007), known for the Shurtmetric System

== See also ==
- Shurtleff College, a college in Alton, Illinois
