= Benjamin Thaw Sr. =

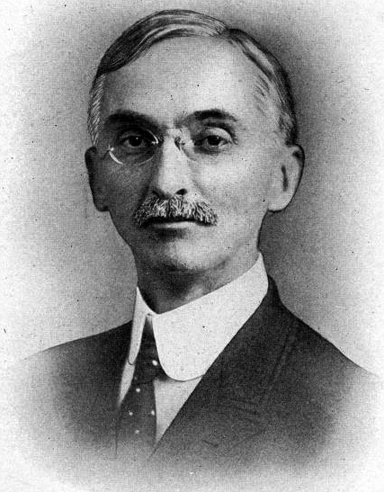
- Born: March 24, 1859; Pittsburgh, Pennsylvania, US
- Died: August 20, 1933 (aged 74); Pittsburgh, Pennsylvania, US
- Education: University of Pittsburgh; Yale University
- Spouse: Elma Ellsworth Dows (m. 1886; died 1931)
- Children: William Thaw II; Rev. Stephen Dows Thaw
- Parent(s): William Thaw Sr. Eliza Burd Blair Thaw
- Relatives: Harry Kendall Thaw (brother); Margaret Copley Thaw (sister); Alice Cornelia Thaw (sister)

Benjamin Thaw Sr. (March 24, 1859 – August 20, 1933) was a Pittsburgh banker and philanthropist.

== Early life ==
Thaw was born in Pittsburgh, Pennsylvania on March 24, 1859. He was one of five surviving children born to Eliza Burd (née Blair) Thaw (1822–1863) and William Thaw Sr. After the death of his mother in 1863, his father remarried to Mary Sibbet Copley, with whom his father had five more children. From his father's second marriage, his half-siblings included Harry Kendall Thaw (known for the 1906 murder of architect Stanford White), Margaret Copley Thaw (who first married a nephew of Andrew Carnegie and secondly, after his death, Roger, Comte de Périgny) and Alice Cornelia Thaw (who married George Seymour, 7th Marquess of Hertford). His father was considered one of the 100 wealthiest Americans, and left an enormous fortune for Thaw and his siblings upon his death in August 1889.

Thaw was educated at the Fourth Ward public school before attending the University of Pittsburgh (then known as the Western University of Pennsylvania). After graduating from the University of Pittsburgh in 1878, Thaw did a year of graduate work at Yale University.

== Career ==
His first job was as a railroad clerk before he organized the Hecla Coke Company with his elder brother, William Thaw Jr. The company was later acquired by the H. C. Frick Coke Company in 1905. Thaw spent much of his time managing his late father's estate and, from 1889 to 1932, he was a trustee of the "coke trust" the elder Thaw created.

Thaw served as a director of the First National Bank, the People's Pittsburgh Bank and was a trustee of the University of Pittsburgh as well as a member of the Pennsylvania Historical Society.

== Personal life ==
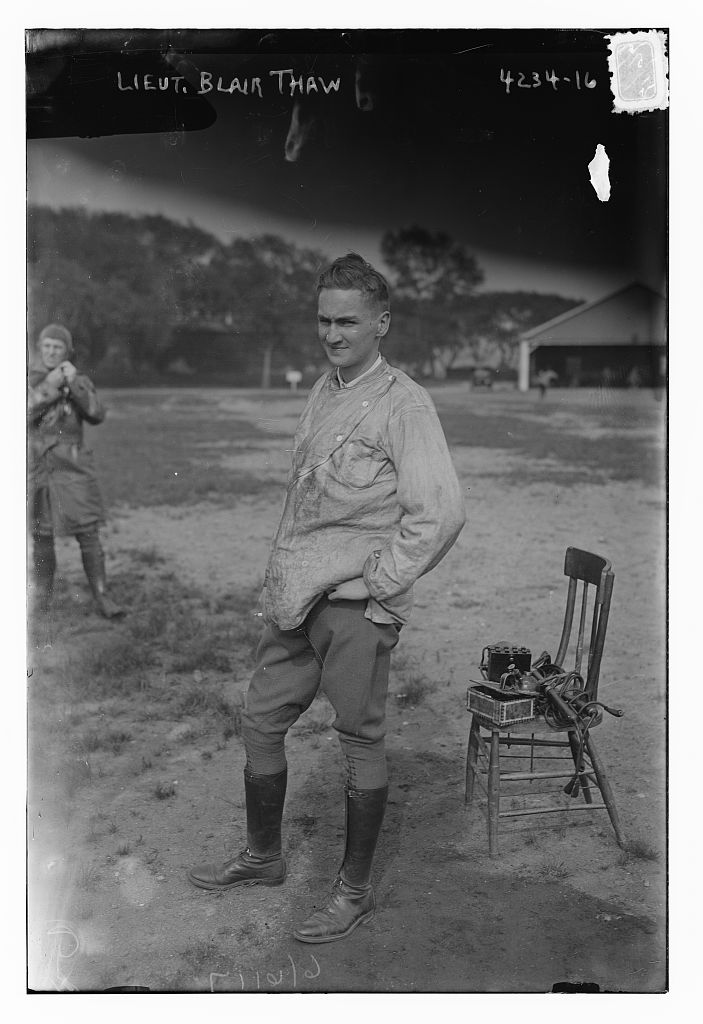
Photograph of his youngest son, Lt. Blair Thaw.

In 1886, Thaw was married to Elma Ellsworth Dows (1861–1931), a daughter of Stephen Leland Dows and Henrietta (née Safely) Dows of Cedar Rapids, Iowa. They spent much of their time in Pittsburgh, but maintained a residence in New York at 854 Fifth Avenue (which was owned by Gov. Robert Livingston Beeckman) and, later, at 640 Park Avenue. Together, they were the parents of the following children:

- Rev. Stephen Dows Thaw (1887–1923), who married Elise Marie Stehlin of Switzerland in 1916.
- Benjamin Thaw Jr. (1888–1937), the first secretary of the American Embassy in London who married Laura Consuelo Morgan, a daughter of diplomat Harry Hays Morgan and sister to Gloria Morgan Vanderbilt, Thelma Furness, Viscountess Furness, and Harry Hays Morgan Jr.
- Henrietta Thaw (1891–1942), who married Lawrence Slade, an official of the New York Trust Company in Paris.
- William Thaw II (1893–1934), who flew with the Lafayette Escadrille, who married Marjorie Everts.
- Alexander Blair Thaw (1898–1918), who was killed while serving in the American flying forces in August 1918.

His wife died at their home in Paris in November 1931. A month after his wife's death, he sold much of the art collection she had acquired over many years. Thaw died at his home in Morewood Place in Pittsburgh on August 20, 1933. He was buried in Allegheny Cemetery.
