= L. Birge Harrison =

American painter

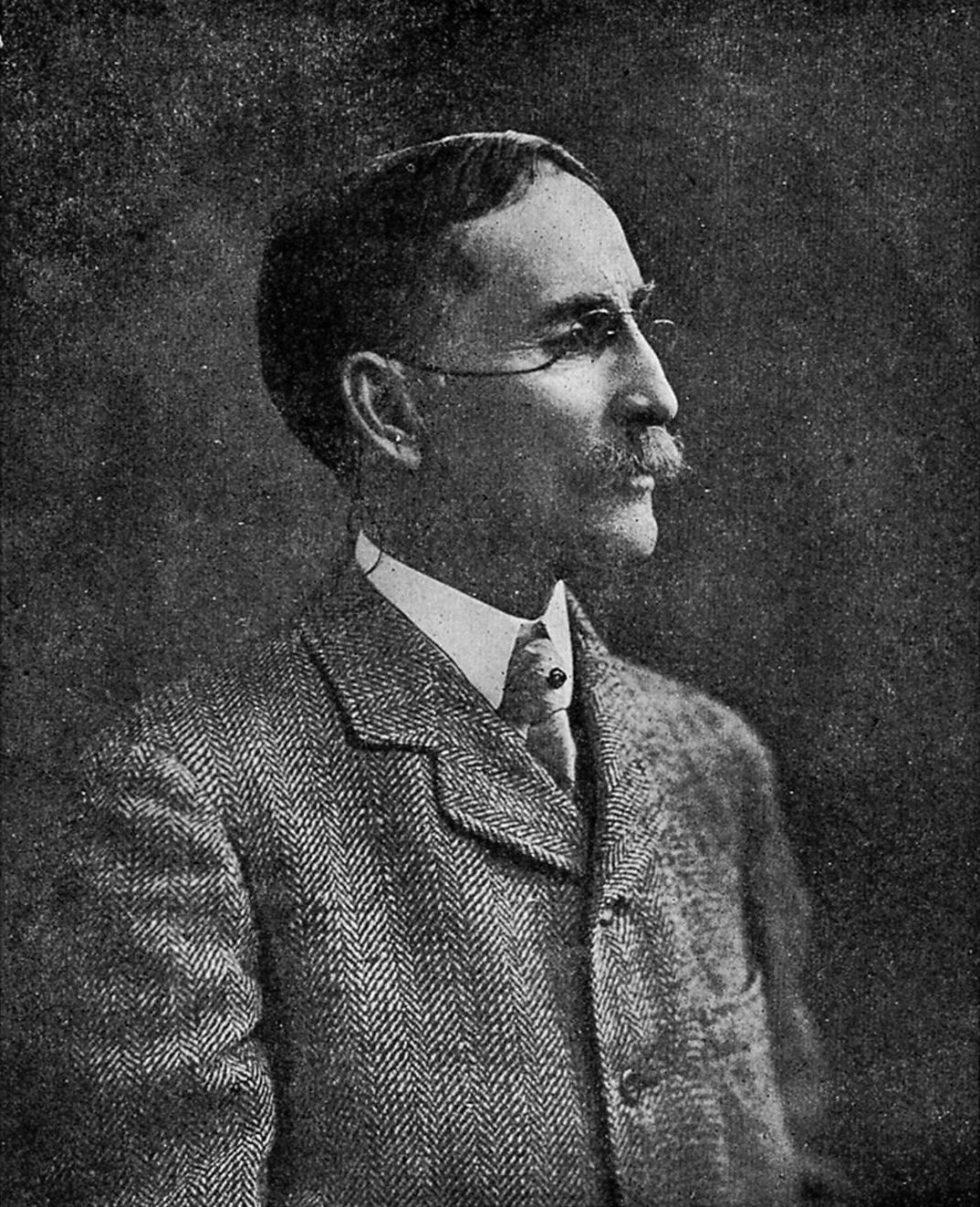
Birge Harrison, 1914

Lovell Birge Harrison (October 28, 1854, Philadelphia, Pennsylvania – 1929) was an American genre and landscape painter, teacher, and writer. He was a prominent practitioner and advocate of Tonalism.

== Life ==
Born in Philadelphia, Birge Harrison was the brother of artist T. Alexander Harrison. He studied first at the Pennsylvania Academy of the Fine Arts in 1874, and later credited Thomas Eakins as a positive influence on his own teaching style. He then went to Paris on the advice of John Singer Sargent to study with Carolus-Duran and at the École des Beaux-Arts under Cabanel. In 1881 Harrison exhibited at the Paris Salon, and in 1882 his Salon entry, Novembre, became one of the first paintings by an American artist to be purchased by the French government. Discussing the painting years later Harrison attributed its handling to "A Scandinavian painter (who) had shown me the secret of atmospheric painting....and....the importance of vibration and refraction in landscape painting." The paintings of this period included peasant subjects that showed the influence of Jules Bastien-Lepage. The limited palette and wistful mood of the early works would continue to be distinguishing features of Harrison's later landscape paintings.

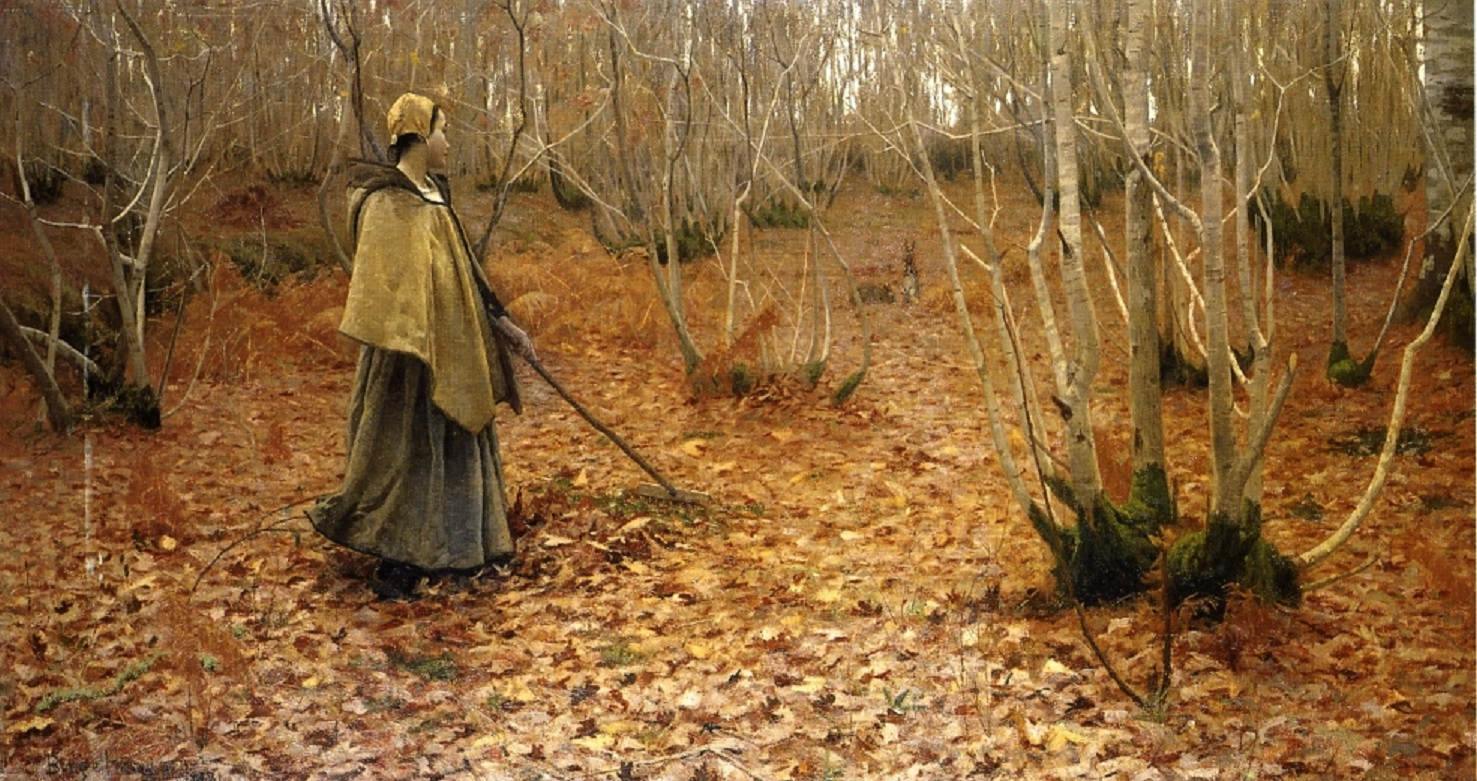
Lowell Birge Harrison, Novembre (1881; musée des beaux-arts de Rennes)

Harrison met the Australian painter Eleanor Ritchie (1854-1895) in the course of his summer landscape travels; they married and returned to America, where he began to exhibit annually at the National Academy of Design, and after 1889 at the Pennsylvania Academy of the Fine Arts. Temporarily forced to stop painting on account of ill health, he spent considerable time between 1889 and 1893 traveling in Australia, the South Seas, and New Mexico, and wrote and illustrated articles for publication. In 1891 Harrison and his wife moved to California, but after her death in 1895 while expecting their first child, Harrison remarried and moved to Plymouth, Massachusetts, where he became a leader of the Tonalist school. He then relocated again, this time to Woodstock, New York at the turn of the century where he founded a school based on his experiments in Tonalism. In 1906 Harrison helped found the Art Students League Summer School in Woodstock, where his pupils would include his niece, the architect and painter Margaret Fulton Spencer. He became known especially for his paintings of landscapes in the snow.

Harrison received numerous prizes and medals, including the gold medal at the Pennsylvania Academy of the Fine Arts in 1910. He became a member of the National Academy of Design in 1910, National Institute of Arts and Letters, New York Water Color Club, Society of American Artists, and was director of the landscape school of the Art Students League.

In 1909 Harrison's lectures were published in a book entitled Landscape Painting; the book was cited as "a standard work for students, and was referred to as "a fine commentary on the technique of the craft." According to art historian William H. Gerdts, Harrison was then "the leading writer in America on contemporary landscape painting." Harrison's writing reveals an interest in the retinal perception of color, and in tonal harmony; he believed that the term Impressionism was descriptive not merely of the recent movement in French painting, but referred to any work done "honestly and sincerely" before nature. Harrison's painting exemplified the lessons he taught, emphasizing the practice of open-air observation rather than technical facility.

Harrison's pupils included Florence Ballin Cramer, Mary Gine Riley and Florence Thaw.

== Paintings ==
- Winter twilight (1910, 30 x 40 cm)
- Meadow in the Connecticut
- November (1881, musée des beaux-arts de Rennes, France)
- Le moulin rouge (1909)
- Fifth Avenue in Winter
- A Puff of Steam
- The Old Inn at Cos Cob (1914)

== Sources ==
- Harrison Genealogy Repository
- Paintings and Sculpture in the Collection of the National Academy of Design, p. 249
- Gerdts, William H. American Impressionism. Abbeville, 1984. ISBN 0-89659-451-3
- Gerdts, William H., et al. Lasting Impressions: American Painters in France 1865–1915. Terra Foundation of the Arts, 1992. ISBN 0-932171-05-2
- Biography, The Johnson Collection
- The New York Times, November 14, 1909
