= William Thaw Sr. =

American businessman (1818–1889)

William Thaw
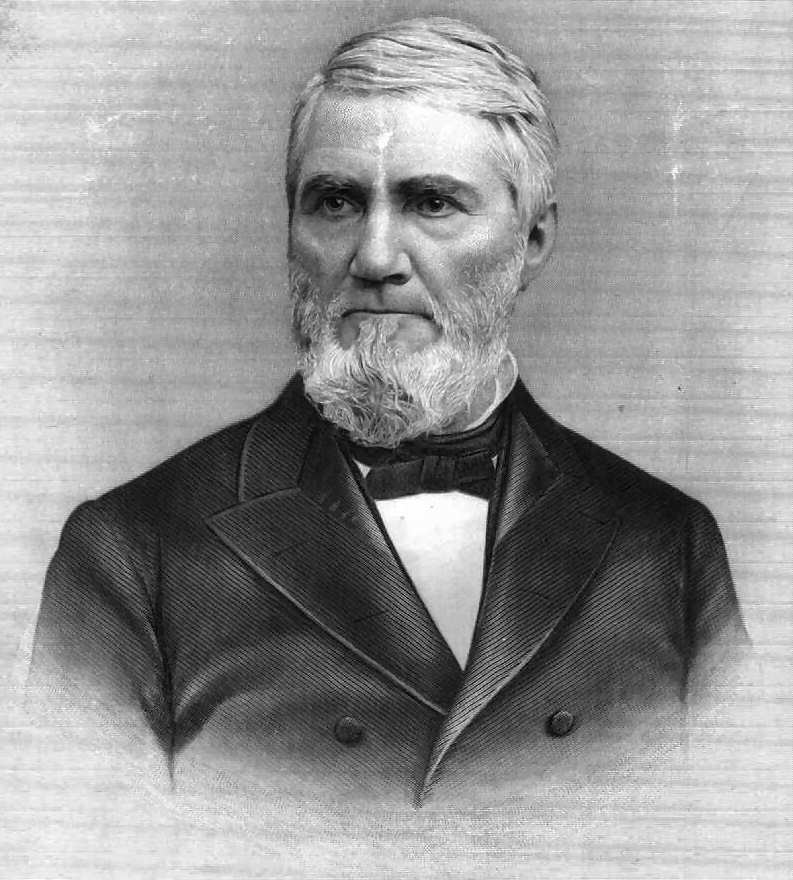
- Born: October 12, 1818; Pittsburgh, Pennsylvania, U.S.
- Died: August 17, 1889 (aged 70); Paris, France
- Spouses: Eliza Burd Blair (married 1841–1863); Mary Sibbet Copley (married 1867–1889)
- Children: Benjamin Thaw Sr.; Harry Kendall Thaw; Margaret Copley Thaw; Alice Cornelia Thaw and 6 others
- Parent(s): John Thaw; Elizabeth Thomas
- Relatives: Russell William Thaw (grandson); William Thaw II (grandson)

Signature
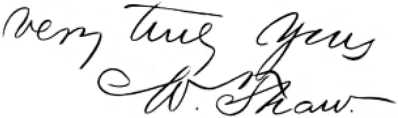

William Thaw Sr. (October 12, 1818 – August 17, 1889) was an American businessman who made his fortune in transportation and banking.

== Early life ==
He was born in Pittsburgh, Pennsylvania, on October 12, 1818, to John Thaw and his wife Elizabeth Thomas.

== Career ==
He worked as a clerk in his father's United States Bank of Philadelphia in Pittsburgh. He later switched to McKee, Clark and Co.

By 1842, he and his brother-in-law Thomas Shields Clarke owned steam canal boats, particularly the Pennsylvania and Ohio Canal. Their company added canal, portage railroad and other steamboat lines.

With the rise of the railroad, Thaw divested the canal business and invested in the new Pennsylvania Company, which managed interests of the Pennsylvania Railroad, in which he was a large shareholder.

=== Philanthropy ===
Thaw endowed science fellowships at Harvard University and Princeton University and bestowed lavish gifts on art and education. He underwrote the building of the Allegheny Observatory for John Brashear, considered at the time one of the ten best in the world.

== Personal life ==
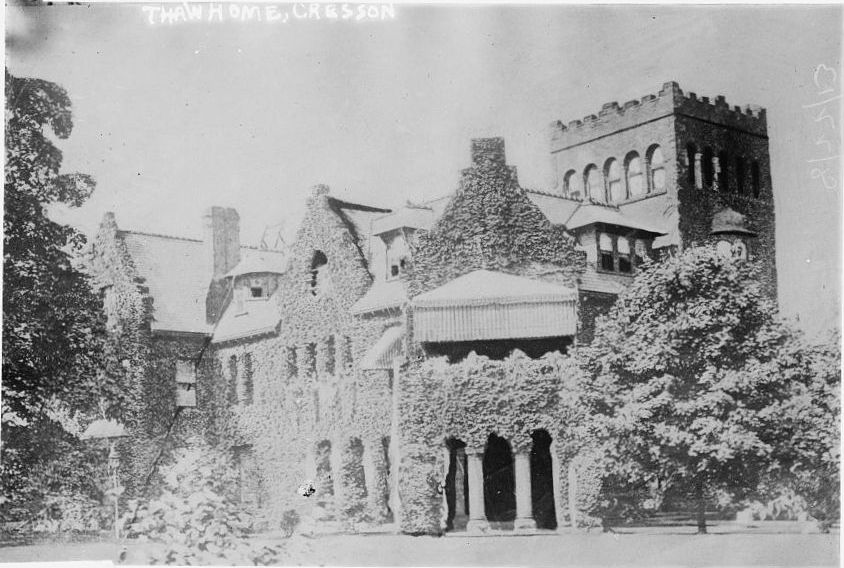
Lyndhurst, the Thaw mansion in Pittsburgh, built 1887–1889

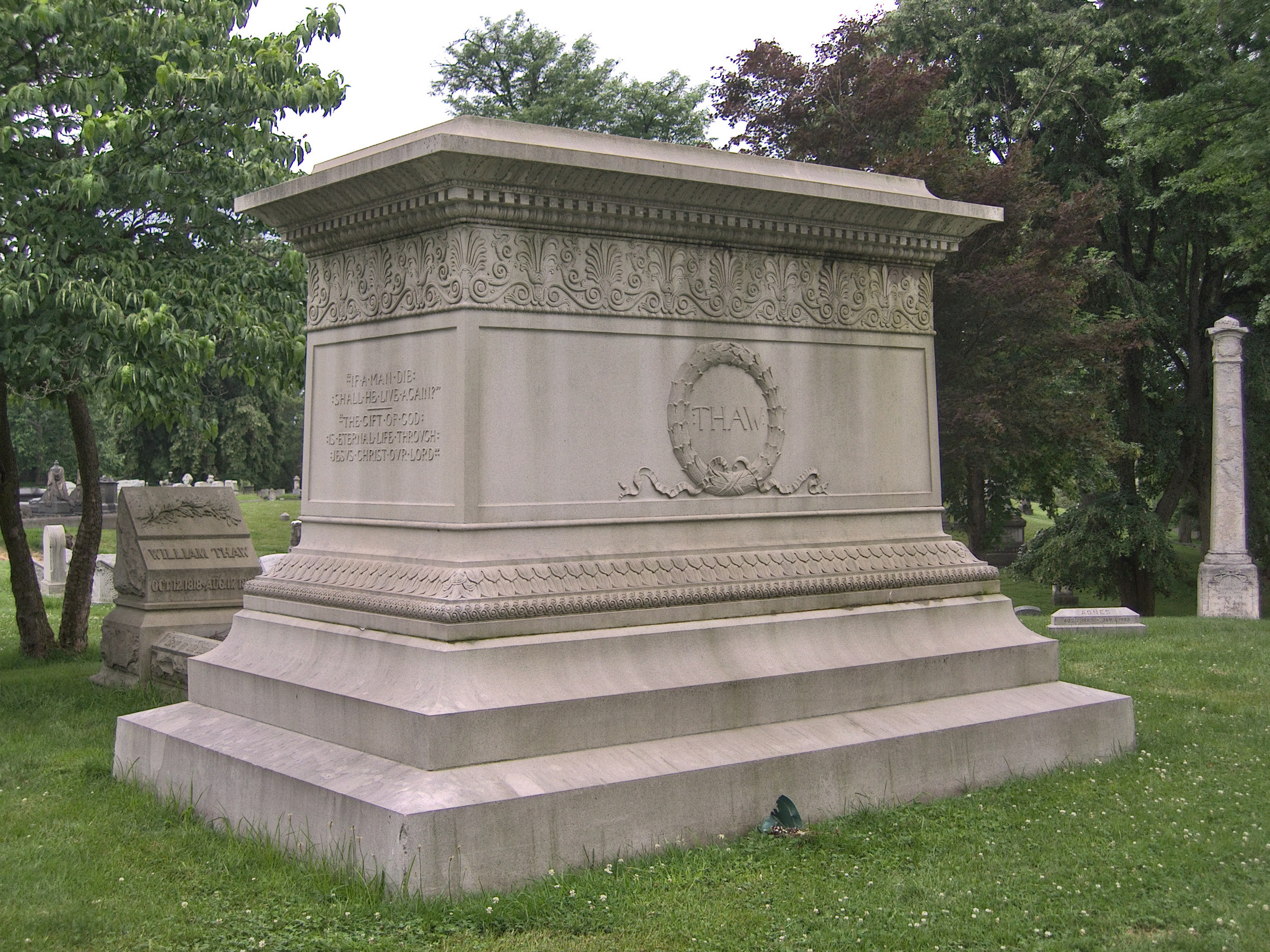
William Thaw monument in Allegheny Cemetery, Pittsburgh

In 1841, William Thaw married Eliza Burd Blair (1822–1863). They had five children that survived childhood:

- Eliza Thaw (1843–1912), who married George Breed Edwards (1842–1887)
- William Thaw Jr. (1853–1892), who married Elizabeth Dohrman (1854–1948)
- Mary Thaw (1856–1944), who in 1879 married William Reed Thompson (1845–1906)
- Benjamin Thaw Sr. (1859–1933), who married Elma Ellsworth Dows (1861–1931)
- Alexander Blair Thaw (1860–1937), who in 1886 married Florence Dow (1864–1940)

In 1867, after the death of his first wife, he married Mary Sibbet Copley (1843–1929). They had five children that survived childhood:

- Harry Kendall Thaw (1871–1947), who in 1906 shot and killed the prominent architect Stanford White in front of hundreds of witnesses. The murder resulted in a sensational "trial of the century" in which Harry Thaw was ruled insane and confined to a mental institution. In his will, he left $10,000, less than 1% of his fortune, to his estranged wife, the film actress and former model Evelyn Nesbit.
- Edward Bernard Thaw (1873–1924), who married (1) 1896: Frieda Marsh (1875-1915), (2) 1906: Jane Olmsted (1880–1958)
- Josiah Copley Thaw (1874–1944), who in 1903 married Mary Harrington Thomson (1881–1947)
- Margaret Copley Thaw (1877–1942), who first married George Lauder Carnegie (1876–1921), nephew of Andrew Carnegie. After his death, she married Roger, Comte de Périgny and became Countess de Périgny.
- Alice Cornelia Thaw (1880–1955), who married George Seymour, 7th Marquess of Hertford (1871–1940). They divorced and she married Geoffrey George Whitney Sr. in 1913.

In 1887, Thaw commissioned architect Theophilus P. Chandler Jr. to build him a home. Lyndhurst, completed in 1889 and demolished around 1942, was located at 1165 Beechwood Boulevard in the Squirrel Hill neighborhood of Pittsburgh.

Thaw died in Paris on August 17, 1889.

=== Legacy ===
He is considered to have been one of the 100 wealthiest Americans, having left an enormous fortune.

Thawville, Illinois, a small town in the east central part of the state, is named in honor of William K. Thaw, who owned a controlling interest in the Gilman, Clinton & Springfield Railroad. Thawville was platted in November 1871. The GCS went into receivership during the panic of 1873 and was later taken over by the Illinois Central Company. Thaw visited the town only once—in February of either 1874 or 1875; at that time he was snowbound in town for two or three days. An attempt to incorporate Thawville failed in 1897, but another attempt in 1903 succeeded.

A plaque on the front of 304 Wood Street in downtown Pittsburgh commemorates William K. Thaw's birthplace.
