= Thew (surname) =

- Pronunciation: /θjuː/
- Language(s): Middle English

Origin
- Meaning: good bodily proportions, muscular development

Thew is an English surname. Its etymology is given by Oxford University Press as deriving from the Old English word thēaw, meaning manner of behaving (origin unknown), and the noun thew, meaning muscular strength, that arose in Middle English and was applied to people with "good bodily proportions, muscular development".

One of the earliest written records of the name Thew was recorded in 1197 in the pipe roll for Alnwick, Northumberland, where a William Thew was "charged 12d. for an enclosure from a forest".

In 1881 the frequency of the Thew surname in the UK was 15 occurrences per million names, which had decreased to 13 occurrences per million name by 1998. Internationally, the frequency of the surname Thew per million names was highest in Australia with 43.36 instances per million names, followed by New Zealand at 19.05 per million, the United States at 2.6 per million and Canada with only 1.6 per million. A one-name study for the surname Thew is registered with the Guild of One-Name Studies.

== Notable people with the surname Thew ==
- Robert Thew (1758–1802), English engraver
- Manora Thew (1891–1987), British actress
- Daniel Thew Wright (1864–1943), American judge
- Linda McCullough Thew (1918–2013), British author
- Julian Thew (born 1967), British poker player
- Joshua Thew (born 1988), British ballet dancer
