= Alice Cornelia Thaw =

American philanthropist

Alice Whitney
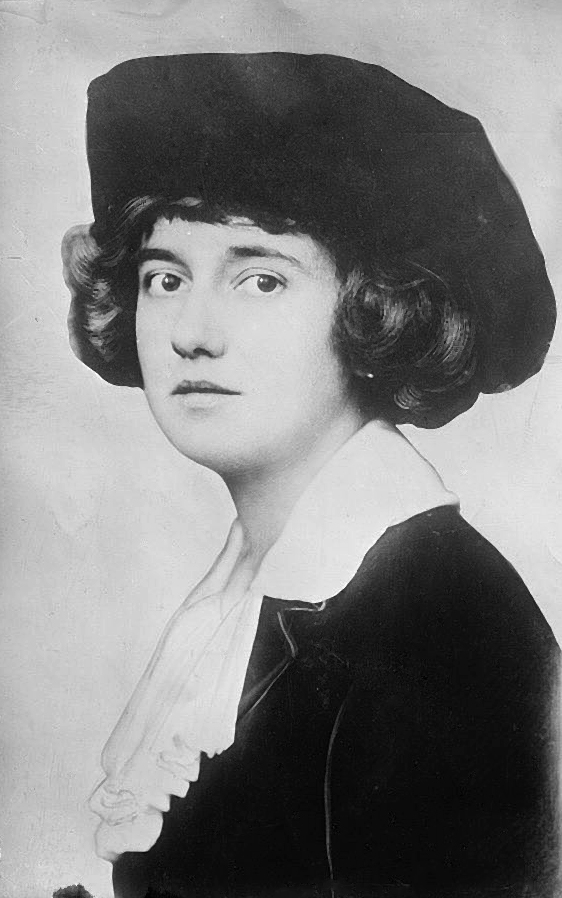
- Born: Alice Cornelia Thaw; January 2, 1880; Pittsburgh, Pennsylvania, U.S.
- Died: May 8, 1955 (aged 75); Milton, Massachusetts, U.S.
- Title: Countess of Yarmouth
- Spouses: George Seymour, Earl of Yarmouth (m. 1903; ann. 1908) Geoffrey George Whitney Sr. (m. 1913)
- Children: 2
- Parent(s): William Thaw Sr. Mary Sibbet Copley
- Relatives: Harry Kendall Thaw (brother); Margaret Copley Thaw (sister); Benjamin Thaw Sr. (half-brother)

Alice Cornelia Thaw (January 2, 1880 – May 8, 1955) was an American philanthropist and, upon her marriage to George Seymour, Earl of Yarmouth (who later succeeded as 7th Marquess of Hertford), the Countess of Yarmouth.

== Early life ==
Thaw was born on January 2, 1880, in Pittsburgh, Pennsylvania. She was the daughter of William Thaw, Sr., who is considered one of the 100 wealthiest Americans of all time arising from his ownership of the Pennsylvania Company, and her father's second wife, Mary Sibbet Copley. From her father's first marriage to the former Eliza Blair, she was a younger half-sister to five (that survived childhood), including Benjamin Thaw Sr., a banker and philanthropist. From her parents marriage, she was one of five additional children (that survived childhood), including Harry Kendall Thaw, who married the actress Evelyn Nesbit (and later murdered Stanford White over her affair with the architect), and Margaret Copley Thaw, who married George Lauder Carnegie, a nephew of Andrew Carnegie, and after his death, Roger, Comte de Périgny.

Her paternal grandparents were John Thaw, an owner of the United States Bank of Philadelphia, and Elizabeth (née Thomas) Thaw and her maternal grandparents were Margaret and Josiah Copley, a pioneer editor who was well known in the community.

Her father died in 1889, after having given an estimated $5,000,000 to charity during his lifetime. From her father's estate, which was divided equally into one-sixteenth shares, nine year old Alice inherited coal lands (held until all of his children became of age and expected to be worth approximately $13,000,000 in the William Thaw Coke Trust), and a one-sixteenth interest in the remainder. Alice, as a daughter of her father's second wife, stood to inherit even more due to her mother's own wealth, totaling $10,000,000 in 1903.

== Personal life ==
In January 1903, George Seymour, Earl of Yarmouth, an amateur actor who was a friend of her elder brother Harry and the eldest son and heir apparent of Hugh Seymour, 6th Marquess of Hertford, was a two-week guest of her mother at their rented residence on Lafayette Square in Washington (owned by former U.S. Senator J. Donald Cameron). Their engagement was announced in February 1903 and they were married shortly thereafter on April 27, 1903, in Pittsburgh, but not before the Earl "extorted" her mother to increase the dowry under the threat he would not go through the marriage. After their marriage, the couple sailed aboard the St. Paul to her husband's native England. Upon leaving the U.S., much was made about debts the Earl had accumulated while in New York, prompting him to comment to reporters:

"I don't owe much here and I don't want any fuss. I don't expect any, as my lawyer is here to meet anybody who may have a claim against me. My father has given Col. Olin money to pay my debts and I want it understood that my wife is not paying them for me. After I leave, if any other creditor comes forward I want him to go to Col. Olin, who will settle the bill."

Reportedly, "scores of tales have been told of the sorrowful life of the Countess, and it was a well-known fact that within a few months after the marriage the ill-treatment of his wife by the Earl began." In January 1908, Alice sued Yarmouth for divorce. Their marriage was annulled in 1908 on the grounds of non-consummation. As part of the divorce, all financial interests were returned to Thaw, and she resumed using her maiden name and moved to Lenox, Massachusetts.

After their divorce, her former father-in-law died in 1912, and her ex-husband succeeded to his titles as the 7th Marquess of Hertford. He died in 1940, having never remarried nor having any children and was succeeded in his titles by his nephew.

=== Second marriage ===
On March 22, 1913, Alice married for a second time to Geoffrey George Whitney Sr. (1882–1953), a stockbroker with Whitney & Elwell, at her sister's home, Plum Orchard at Dungeness on Cumberland Island in Georgia. Together, they lived in Milton, Massachusetts, maintained a summer home known as Little Harbor Farm in Woods Hole, Massachusetts, and were the parents of two sons:

- Geoffrey George Whitney Jr. (1915–2001), who married Pauline M. Cheverfils. He later married Linda Cole (1932–2011) in 1968.
- William Thaw Whitney (1917–1969), who married Mary Louise Johnstone (1915–1974).

Her second husband, also a noted horticulturist, died in July 1953. Alice died of a heart attack at her home in Milton on May 8, 1955. She was buried at the cemetery in Woods Hole.
