= William Lewis Shurtleff =

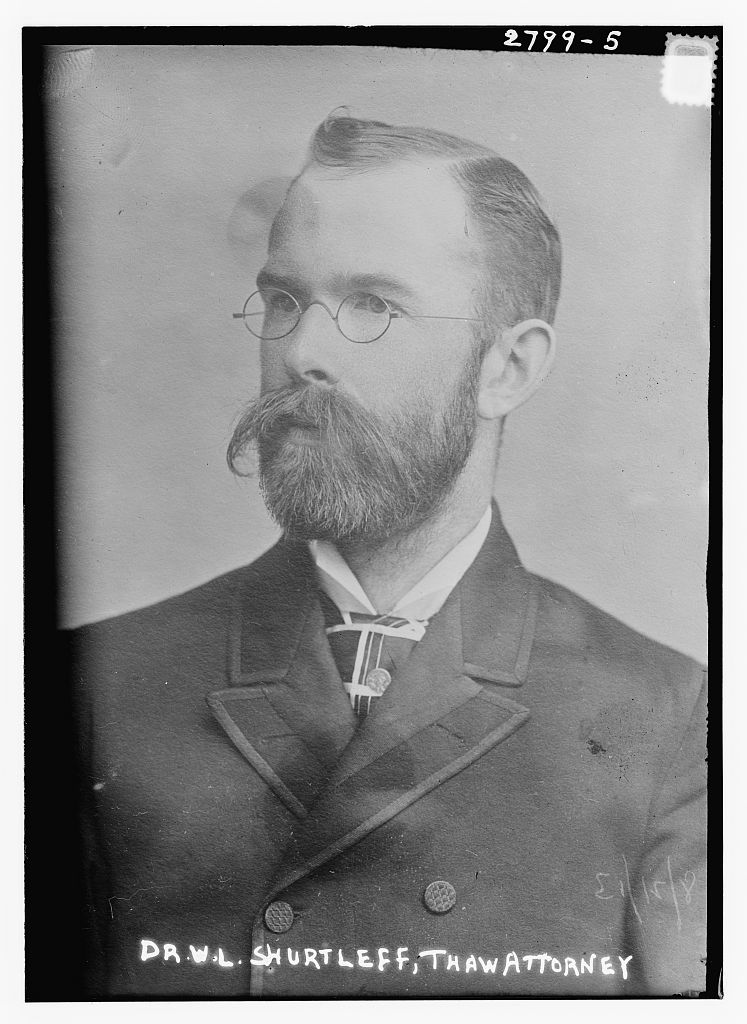
- Born: March 29, 1864; Coaticook, Canada East
- Died: January 1, 1954 (aged 89)
- Spouse: Edna L. Alger (1868-1929)
- Parent(s): Ruth E. and Lyman Shurtleff

William Lewis Shurtleff, KC, (March 29, 1864 – January 1, 1954) was a Quebec lawyer and newspaper owner. He was the defense lawyer for Harry Kendall Thaw in 1913. The Buffalo Morning Express calls him "one of the leading lawyers in Canada".

== Biography ==
He was born on March 29, 1864, in Coaticook to Ruth E. and Lyman Shurtleff. In March 1889, he and L.S. Channel bought the Coaticook Observer, which had been founded in 1869. In December of that year, Shurtleff became the sole owner of the newspaper. In 1897, he became secretary-treasurer of the Coaticook Electric Light and Power Company. In 1911, he wrote a pamphlet on reciprocity, as the possibility of free trade between Canada and the United States was then known. In 1912, he was appointed organizer-in-chief for the Eastern Townships by the Conservative Association. In 1914, he conducted an investigation relating to the dismissal of a postmaster. His report was tabled in the House of Commons on March 5, 1914.

Mr. Pelletier, a member of the King's Privy Council, presented, --Return to an Order of the House of the 2nd February, 1914, for a copy of all charges, correspondence, letters, telegrams and other documents, relating to the dismissal of Mr. Goyette, Postmaster at St. Valrien de Milton, Shefford County, Quebec, and of the evidence taken, and of the reports of investigation held by Dr. W. L. Shurtleff, in regard to the same.

In 1916, he was a member of the Protestant Committee of the Council of Public Instruction of Quebec.

He died on New Year's Day, January 1, 1954. He was buried in Mount Forest Cemetery in Coaticook, Quebec.
