= Baganset U Thaw =

- ပန်းကန်စက် ဦးသော်
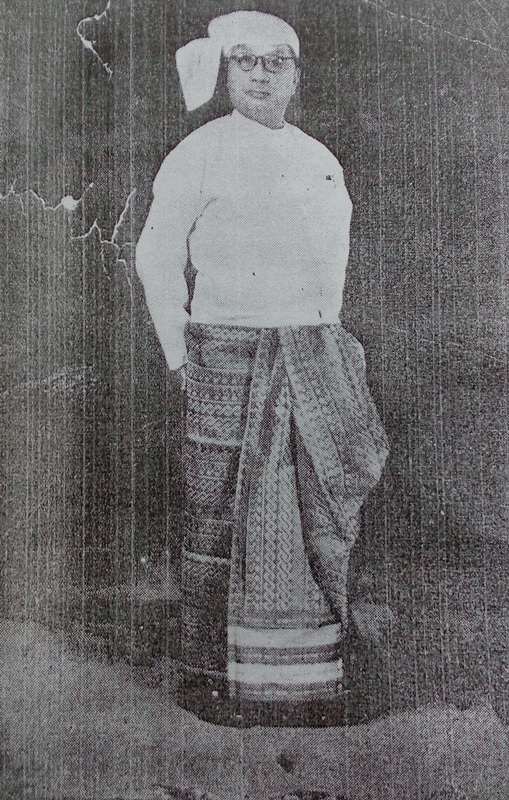
- Born: Thaw; 5 September 1893; Paungde, Bago Region
- Died: 25 June 1980 (aged 86); Yangon
- Occupations: Businessman, politician, administrator
- Known for: First manufacturer of porcelain products in Burma
- Notable work: Donations to establish national schools
- Spouse: Hla Khin (m. 1913)
- Children: none
- Parents: Pho Sint (father); Thet (mother)
- Relatives: Tin Hla (younger sister); Maung Maung (younger brother); Myoma Myint Kywe (grandnephew)
- Awards: Taingkyo Pyikyo Saung (1940); Naing-Ngant Gon-Yi (First Class) (1980)

U Thaw (Burmese: ဦးသော်; 5 September 1893 – 25 June 1980), known honorifically as Baganset U Thaw (Burmese: ပန်းကန်စက် ဦးသော်), was a Burmese businessman, trader, administrator, and politician. He was the first manufacturer of porcelain products in Burma. He was a member of the Legislative Council of Burma, patron of the Young Men's Buddhist Association (YMBA), chairman of Myoma National High School Administration Board, and one of the leaders of the General Council of Burmese Associations.

== Early life and education ==
U Thaw was born on 5 September 1893 in Paungde, Pyay District, Burma. He was the eldest son of Pho Sint and Thet, who owned rice mills. He had a younger sister named Tin Hla and a younger brother, Maung Maung. He was descended from the famous general Maha Thiha Thura, and his grandfather, Bo Shwe Kon (ဘိုးရွှေကွန်), was the grandson of Singu Min, who was the son of King Hsinbyushin.

From an early age, U Thaw helped his parents in the mills and the rice business. He passed the matriculation examination at Pyay Government High School in 1912.

== Business career ==
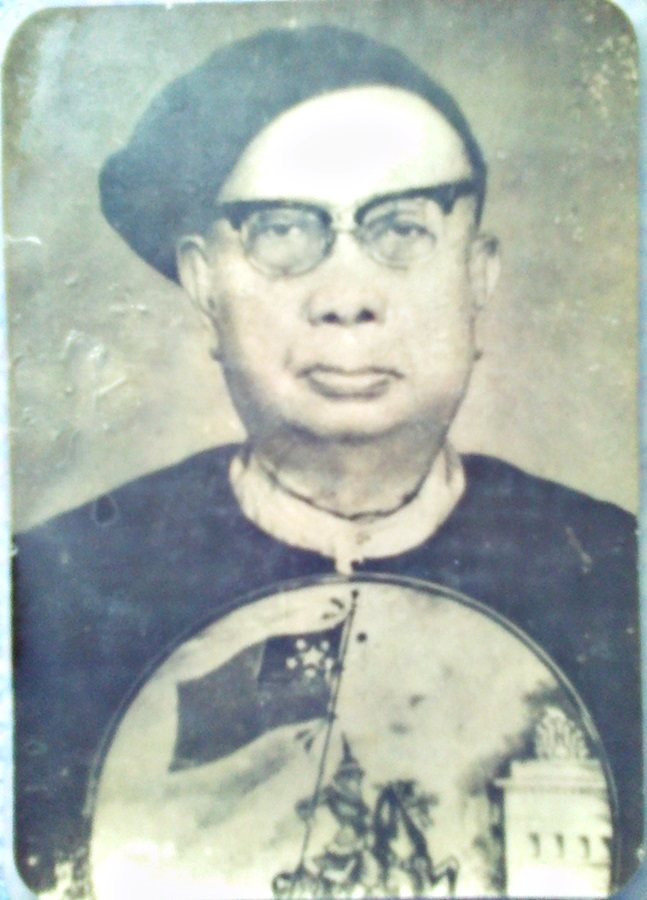
Baganset U Thaw and his plate featuring portrait of Maha Thiha Thura

In 1921, he started the first pottery business in Burma. Four years later he built a factory that manufactured porcelain products - mainly plates, cups, and flower pots. It was very close to Insein Khawe Farm (now nearby Thamine Myo Thit Railway Station, Mayangon Township). As the founder of a porcelain factory, the word baganset, which means "plate factory" in Burmese, was added before his name. By 1939 his porcelain products had become popular in several Asian countries, especially Burma and China.

In the 1949 Battle of Insein during the Karen Conflict, his factory was destroyed by Burmese naval Bofors, artillery shells, and bombs. He wrote about his financial ruin in The Rotarian magazine, published in 1951.

He is featured in Burmese biography books and lists of Burmese entrepreneurs.

== Political career ==
As a young man, he led the anti-enlargement nationalist movement. In 1918, at the age of 25, he was elected Chief Magistrate. He also donated money to help establish several national schools; he was one of the founders of Yangon Myoma National School in 1920. In 1922, he won a seat on the Legislative Council of Burma representing northern Tharrawaddy District, Bago Division. Later he served as a judge and the chairman of the Myoma National High School Administration Board.

== Awards and honour ==
In 1940, the British government recognised U Thaw with the Taingkyo Pyikyo Saung (T.P.S) award, which is given to persons who have promoted the welfare of their country. The Burmese government awarded him the national title Naing-Ngant Gon-Yi (First Class) in 1980.

== Family ==
U Thaw married Hla Khin in 1913 while starting up his business. They had no children.

His younger sister, Tin Hla, married Ba Oo (also known as Hinthada U Ba Oo), one of the leaders of the Rangoon University Students' Boycott in 1920. Myoma U Than Kywe became their son-in-law, and their grandson is Myoma Myint Kywe, a prominent writer.
