= Maung Thaw Ka =

- Born: Ba Thaw; 1928; Shwebo, British Burma
- Died: 11 June 1991 (aged 62–63); Yangon, Myanmar
- Burial place: Kandaw Gale Sunni Muslim cemetery
- Other name: Major Ba Thaw
- Occupations: Writer, Poet, Politician and Soldier
- Political party: National League for Democracy
- Parent(s): Hman Gyi; Hman

Maung Thaw Ka (Burmese: မောင်သော်က) was the pen name of retired Major Ba Thaw (Navy). He was a satirist, popular speaker and Central Executive Committee member of the National League for Democracy (NLD) of Burma.

== Early life ==
Maung Thaw Ka was born in 1928 at Shwebo, upper Burma. His parents are U Hman Gyi and Daw Myaing. He attended the Shwebo National Government High School.

He passed Matriculation and joined Burma (Navy) as a sea cadet in 1947.

== In the Navy ==
He was promoted as the captain of the Navy ship No 103. He was involved in a shipwreck while serving as the commanding officer on a coast guard cutter patrolling the south-eastern coastline of Burma. Lieutenant Ba Thaw and the 26 other Navy personnel on board transferred to two inflated rubber life rafts. One life raft was lost with all nine passengers on board but the second life raft was rescued by a Japanese ship 12 days later. By then, seven of the 18 men on the life raft were dead and another man died on the rescue ship. Maung Thaw Ka wrote a gripping book about the harrowing time he and his mates spent under a searing sun on the small life raft, which carried only boiled sweets and water sufficient to keep 10 men alive for three days.

He retired as a Major from the Navy.

== Journalist and poet ==
He wrote articles, stories, poems in Myawaddy, Sit Pyan (Veteran), Sit Ngha Lone (Heart of the Military), Ngwe Tar Yee and other magazines and journals. He was the Chief Editor of Forward (English) and Shae’ Tho’ (Forward in Burmese) of the BSPP official propaganda journals. He also wrote many articles in the daily newspapers. His satirical speeches and poems critical of BSPP and Slorc are notable in Burma. Early in the 1980s, in one of his articles, he wrote that
Poems can change blood and tears to ink He not only wrote his own poetry, he translated many poems from English to Burmese, some of which were surprisingly romantic: the love poetry of Shakespeare, Robert Herrick, John Donne and Shelley. There was also a translation of William Cowpers' "The Solitude of Alexander Selkirk", which he said was dedicated to himself. Perhaps it was the last verse that appealed to him.

But the seafowl is gone to her nest,
The beast is laid down in his lair;
Even here is a season of rest,
And I to my cabin repair.
There is mercy in every place,
And mercy, encouraging thought!
Gives affliction a grace
And reconciles man to his lot.

Maung Thaw Ka's irrepressible sense of humour came across in many of his writings, which could perhaps be described as satire without malice. One of his witticisms became highly popular during the years of socialist rule in Burma. On being told that a fellow writer believed in ghosts, Maung Thaw Ka riposted: "He believes in anything, he even believes in the Burma Socialist Programme Party!"
Dedicated to
The ones I love,
In number so few,
That I owe so much
In ways so many.

== After retirement from government ==
He conducted English-language tuition classes and lecture courses in navigation science for foreign going sailors.

== NLD Central Executive Committee (CEC) member ==
He was a close associate of the opposition leader Aung San Suu Kyi, and had been instrumental in persuading her to appear in public during the pro-democracy uprising in August the year before.
On 17 August 1988, he signed a petition to the army to stop the indiscriminate shooting and killing of the people to wipe out the dissidents. Later he was elected as the Chairman of All Burma Journalists' Association. After the coup d'état, when the military government allowed the formation of political parties, he continued to be the CEC member in the NLD and also act as the Sagaing Division's Chief Organizer.

"They (Maung Thaw Ka's articles) made people laugh and at the same time fill us with anger and pain," a Burmese from Rangoon said. He was severely tortured and beaten during his interrogation – he was also locked up in a small cell, according to his friend and fellow writer, Maung Sin Kye. He was arrested for writing a letter to a Navy military officer during the 1988 uprising; he was accused of trying to cause a mutiny in the Army. He was sentenced to 20 years imprisonment with hard labour by a military tribunal on 5 October 1989 with the 1950 Emergency Act 5 (a), 5 (b)and 5/J; 122 (1).

== In the Insein Prison ==
Before his arrest, he had been suffering from chronic spondylitis, a spinal disease. A severe beating during a hunger strike in Insein on 25 September 1990 left him paralysed. He received only a minimum of medical care from the prison doctors and was denied access to specialists. "Ko Thaw’s health condition has always been poor. When the military officers beat and kick him, it worsens his condition. When he was ill, he was denied medical care," Maung Sin Kye said.

When students in jail staged a hunger strike in 1991, Maung Thaw Ka gave his full support. For that, he was badly beaten, tortured and locked in small cell without food when Slorc sent soldiers to crush the "prison insurrection". Some students were reportedly killed by troops during the hunger strike. "They finally killed his voice," a Burmese who was close to Maung Thaw Ka in Rangoon said.
At the time he entered Insein Jail, Maung Thaw Ka was already suffering from a chronic disease that was laying his muscles to waste. His movements were stiff and jerky, and everyday matters, such as bathing, dressing or eating, involved for him a series of difficult manoeuvres which could barely be completed without assistance. For a man with his health problems, life in solitary confinement was a continuous struggle to cope. His already much-eroded physical system was unable to withstand the inhuman conditions of Insein Jail for long. Following a heart attack, he was sent to Rangoon General Hospital on 8 June 1991. He died three days later at the age of 65. He was buried at Kandaw Gale Sunni cemetery.
