= Linda McCullough Thew =

British writer

Linda McCullough Thew (nee Summers, 13 April 1918 – 25 December 2013) was a British author. She wrote short stories and books and produced programs for television and radio. She is most noted for her memoir of life in the town of Ashington, The Pit Village and the Store, which was later dramatized for British television.

== Biography ==
McCullough Thew was born in Ashington. She left school at 14 to work in the village store in Ashington, Northumberland (recounted in The Pit Village and the Store). It was in the 1930s when she started and she was the first woman to work as an assistant at that co-operative store.

In 1942, she joined the ATS where she worked on anti-aircraft radar. She transferred to the Army Education Corps and subsequently took a teachers' training course in Newcastle. McCullough Thew "pioneered sex education in schools" and produced programs for television and radio about human relationships in the mid-1960s. After a career in teaching she became a full-time writer. The Pit Village and the Store was dramatized by Channel 4 and broadcast in 1987.

McCullough Thew died at East Riding Residential Care Home in Morpeth on Christmas Day, 2013. Items that she had collected from her past, including World War II memorabilia, were donated to the Woodhorn Museum.

== Work ==
McCullough Thew's autobiographical narrative about the Ashington Co-operative Society was considered a notable study of the co-operative movement in England by Nicole Robertson. Labour History called The Pit Village and the Store an "affectionate memoir of life in Ashington."

== Publications ==
- The Pit Village and the Store: Portrait of a Mining Past Pluto Press (31 October 1985) ISBN 978-0745300696
- From Store to War Pluto Press (Nov 1987) ISBN 978-0745302515
- A Tune for Bears to Dance to Bridge Studios (Oct 1992) ISBN 978-1872010755
- Living My Life, Vol. 2 Emma Goldman (ed. Linda McCullough Thew), 1988, ISBN 9780745301792
