= Florence Thaw =

American painter

Florence Thaw (February 17, 1864 – March 5, 1940) was an American painter.

Born in New York City, Thaw studied with Abbott Handerson Thayer and L. Birge Harrison in that city; she also attended the Académie Julian in Paris. She was married to Alexander Blair Thaw, with whom she moved to Washington, D.C., where they are both recorded as being active beginning in 1924; she is also known to have been active in England, in Sussex, around the turn of the century. Primarily a portraitist, she exhibited with the Society of Washington Artists and the Arts Club of Washington, also showing work at the Pennsylvania Academy of the Fine Arts and the National Academy of Design. The Yorke Gallery presented one-woman shows of her work in 1925, 1928, and 1929. She died in Washington, D.C., and is buried with her husband in the Rockland Cemetery in Rockland, New York. Her 1903 portrait of her teacher L. Birge Harrison is owned by the National Academy of Design. Thaw and her husband were friends of the philosopher F. C. S. Schiller.
