= Mary Sibbet Copley =

American philanthropist

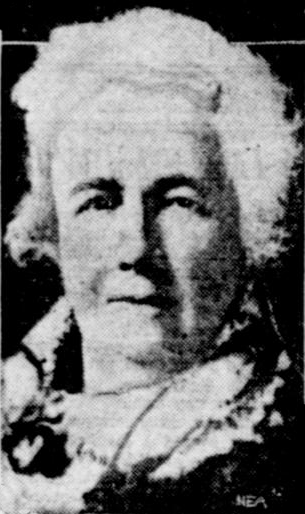
- Copley circa 1920
- Born: June 19, 1843; Armstrong County, Pennsylvania, US
- Died: June 6, 1929 (aged 85); Pittsburgh, Pennsylvania, US
- Resting place: Allegheny Cemetery
- Occupation: Philanthropist
- Spouse: William Thaw, Sr. (m. 1867–1889)
- Children: 5, including Harry, Margaret, Alice
- Relatives: Russell William Thaw (grandson)

Mary Sibbet Copley Thaw (June 19, 1843 – June 9, 1929) was an American philanthropist and charity worker.

== Early life ==
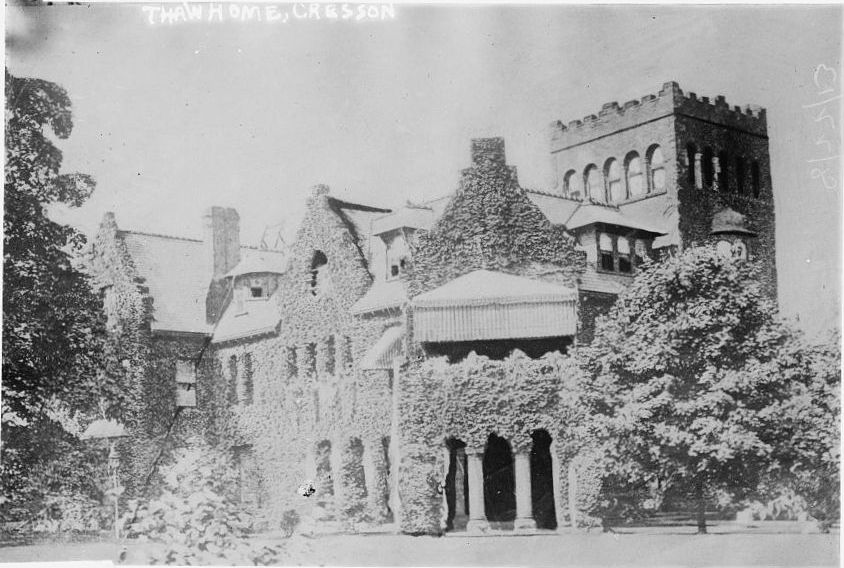
"Lyndhurst", the Thaw mansion in Pittsburgh, built 1887-89.

Mary was born at Appleby Manor near Kittanning, Pennsylvania in Armstrong County on June 19, 1843. She was the daughter of Margaret and Josiah Copley, a pioneer editor who was well known in the community.

== Personal life ==
In 1867, she married William Thaw, Sr. (1818–1889) after the death of his first wife. Together, they had five children that survived childhood:

- Harry Kendall Thaw (1871–1947), who would later murder Stanford White In his will, he left $10,000, less than 1% of his fortune, to wife Evelyn Nesbit.
- Edward Thaw (1873–1924), who married Jane Olmsted (1880–1958)
- Josiah Copley Thaw (1874–1944), who married Mary Harrington Thomson (1881–1947)
- Margaret Copley Thaw (1877–1942), who first married George Lauder Carnegie (1876–1921), nephew of Andrew Carnegie. After his death, she married Roger, Comte de Périgny and became Countess de Périgny.
- Alice Cornelia Thaw (1880–1955), who married George Seymour, 7th Marquess of Hertford (1871–1940). They divorced and she married Geoffrey George Whitney, Sr. in 1913.

She died, a few days before her 87th birthday, on June 9, 1929, of pneumonia. She was buried in Allegheny Cemetery in Pittsburgh.

=== Philanthropy ===
After her husband's death in 1889, she used the wealth she inherited to fund archaeology research, including funds for prominent women archaeologists including Alice Fletcher and Zelia Nuttall. Thaw also funded the Thaw Fellowship at the Peabody Museum of Archaeology and Ethnology at Harvard College.

Thaw was also the primary philanthropist supporting the Omaha Presbyterian Theological Seminary. After her initial contribution of the Cozzens Hotel in downtown Omaha in 1902, she made regular donations, practically underwriting the institution. In 1929, she left a bequest of $150,000 to the seminary.
