= William Thaw II =

American aviator (1893–1934)

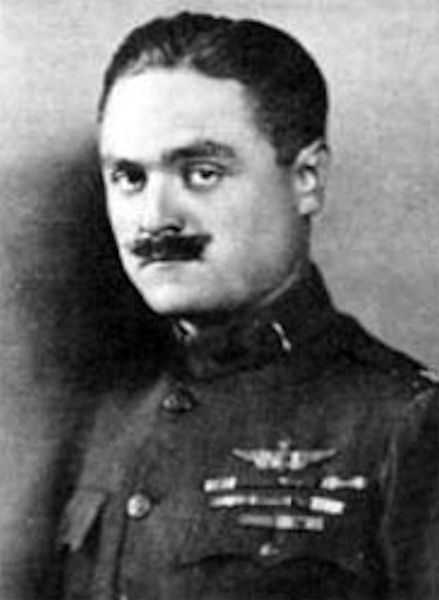
- Lieutenant Colonel William Thaw II, 1918
- Born: 12 August 1893; Pittsburgh, Pennsylvania,
- Died: 22 April 1934 (aged 40); Pittsburgh, Pennsylvania
- Burial place: Allegheny Cemetery, Pittsburgh, Pennsylvania, Plot: Section: 20, Lot: 55
- Military career
- Allegiance: France; United States
- Branch: Aéronautique Militaire (France); Air Service, United States Army
- Service years: 1914–1918 (France); 1918 (USA)
- Rank: Lieutenant Colonel
- Units: Aéronautique Militaire: Escadrille D.6; Escadrille C.42; Escadrille N.65; Escadrille N.124 (Lafayette Escadrille); Air Service, United States Army: 103d Aero Squadron; 3d Pursuit Group
- Commands: 103rd Aero Squadron; 3d Pursuit Group
- Conflicts: World War I
- Awards: Distinguished Service Cross with Oak Leaf Cluster, french Legion d'Honneur and Croix de Guerre

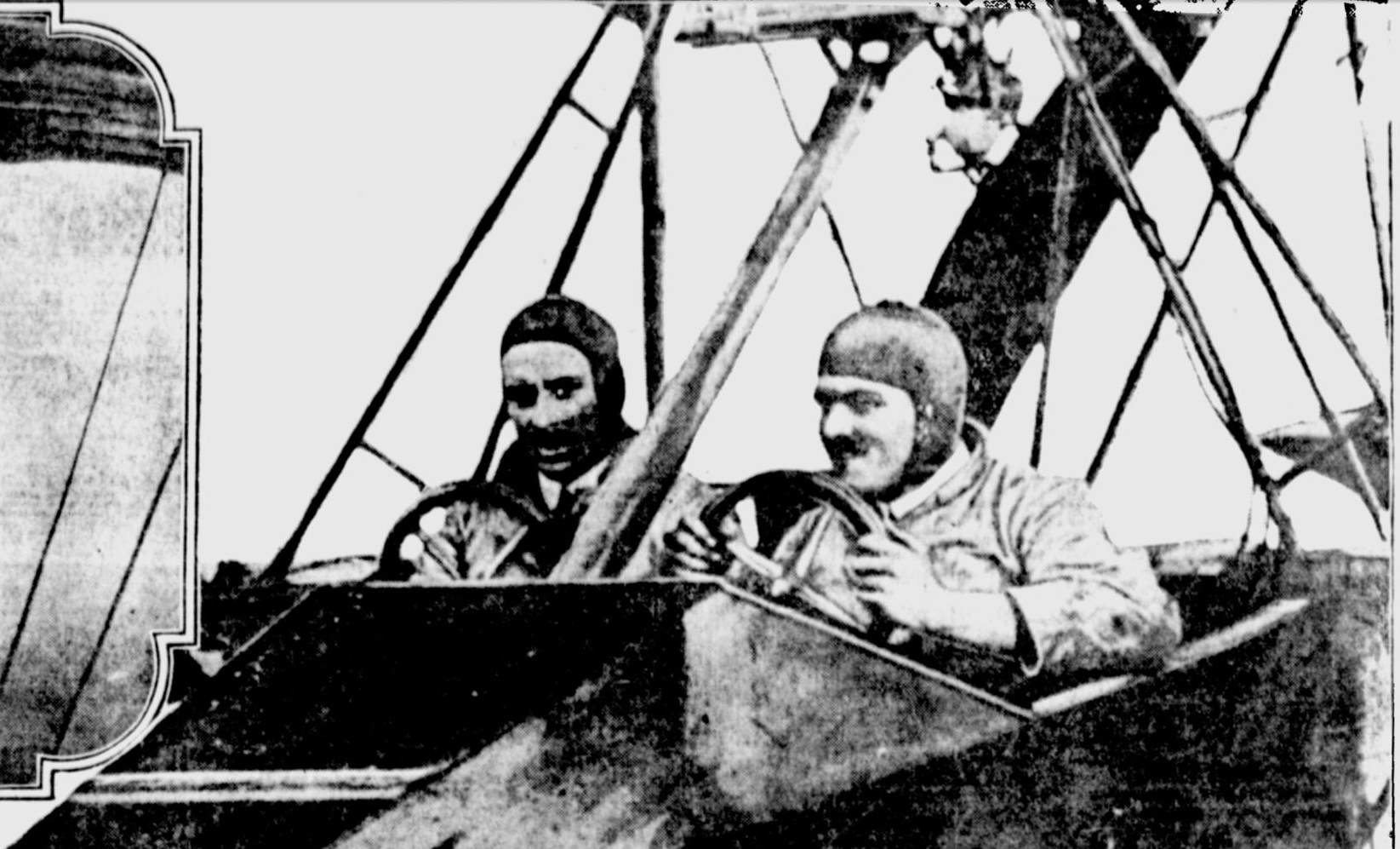
William Thaw II and Stephen McGordon photographed while flying under the four bridges of New York's East River, October 1913. Mr. Thaw is seated at the left hand steering wheel at the right of the picture.

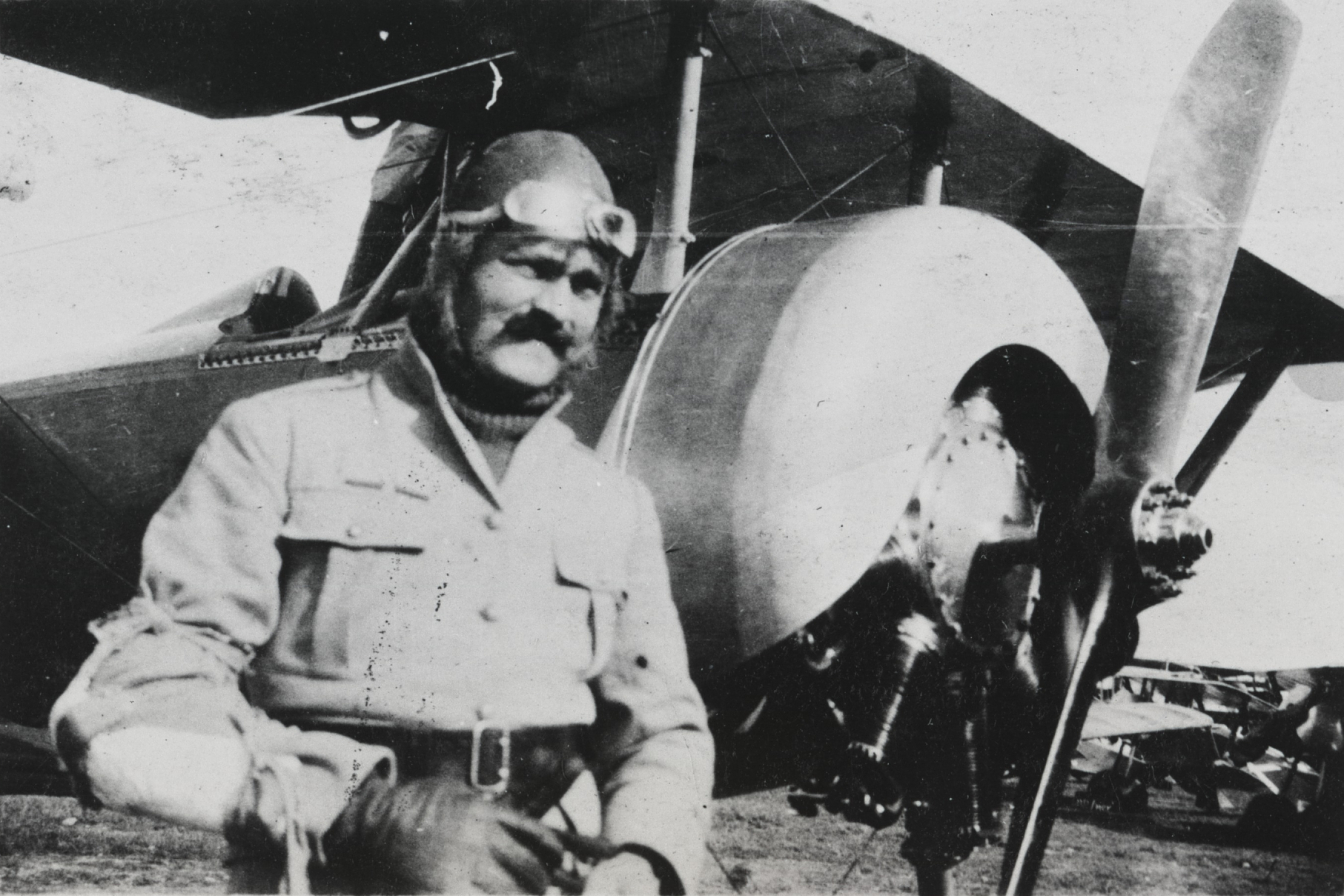
William Thaw II, right arm in a cast, member of the Lafayette Escadrille stands in front of a Nieuport XVI

Lieutenant Colonel William Thaw II (12 August 1893 – 22 April 1934) was an American combat aviator who served in World War I and became a flying ace. Credited with five confirmed and two unconfirmed aerial victories, he is believed to be the first American to engage in aerial combat in the war. He was the first to fly up the East River under all four bridges.

== Early life ==
He was born on August 12, 1893, to Benjamin Thaw, Sr. He learned to fly in 1913, while he was attending Yale University. His father bought him a Curtiss Hydro flying boat that he took to France for the Schneider Trophy races. When war broke out, Thaw gave his airplane to the French and enlisted in the Foreign Legion.

== Military career ==
He joined Escadrille 6. He then became a corporal in Escadrille 42 in 1915, flying a Caudron. He flew a Nieuport in Escadrille 65, before transferring into a French unit composed of American volunteers, known as the Escadrille Americaine, Escadrille 124 under its new designation became nicknamed the Lafayette Escadrille.

Thaw scored his first victory using a Nieuport on 24 May 1916. His next was on 27 April 1917. He had two unconfirmed claims in late 1917. He was transferred to the United States Army Air Service, where he commanded the 103rd Aero Squadron and the 3rd Pursuit Group. He would score three quick wins in April and May 1918. His final tally was one enemy observation balloon and four airplanes shot down.

Thaw has been credited with purchasing the Escadrille's famed pet male lion "Whiskey". Purchased by several pilots for 500 francs, the lion was adopted by the unit as a sort of mascot. Eventually Whiskey and a female lion purchased by the Escadrille, "Soda", were taken to a Paris Zoo (ref. Air & Space, January 2015), but still remembered the pilot. In one visit, the lions rolled over on their backs in their cage in order to allow Thaw to pet them.

== Final years ==
He married Marjorie Everts on March 2, 1921. He died of pneumonia on 22 April 1934 in Pittsburgh, Pennsylvania. He was buried in Allegheny Cemetery. His widow died in 1936.

== Honors and awards ==
- Distinguished Service Cross (DSC): "The Distinguished Service Cross is presented to William Thaw, Major (Air Service), U.S. Army, for extraordinary heroism in action near Reims, France, March 26, 1918. Major Thaw was the leader of a patrol of three planes which attacked five enemy monoplanes and three battle planes. He and another member of the patrol brought down one enemy plane and the three drove down, out of control, two others, and dispersed the remainder."
- Distinguished Service Cross (DSC) with Oak Leaf Cluster: "The Distinguished Service Cross is presented to William Thaw, Major (Air Service), U.S. Army, for extraordinary heroism in action near Montaigne, France, April 20, 1918. In the region of Montaigne Major Thaw attacked and brought down, burning, an enemy balloon. While returning to his own lines the same day he attacked two enemy monoplanes, one of which he shot down in flames."
- French Ærslegionen.

== See also ==
- List of World War I flying aces from the United States
