= Margaret Copley Thaw =

- Comtesse de Périgny
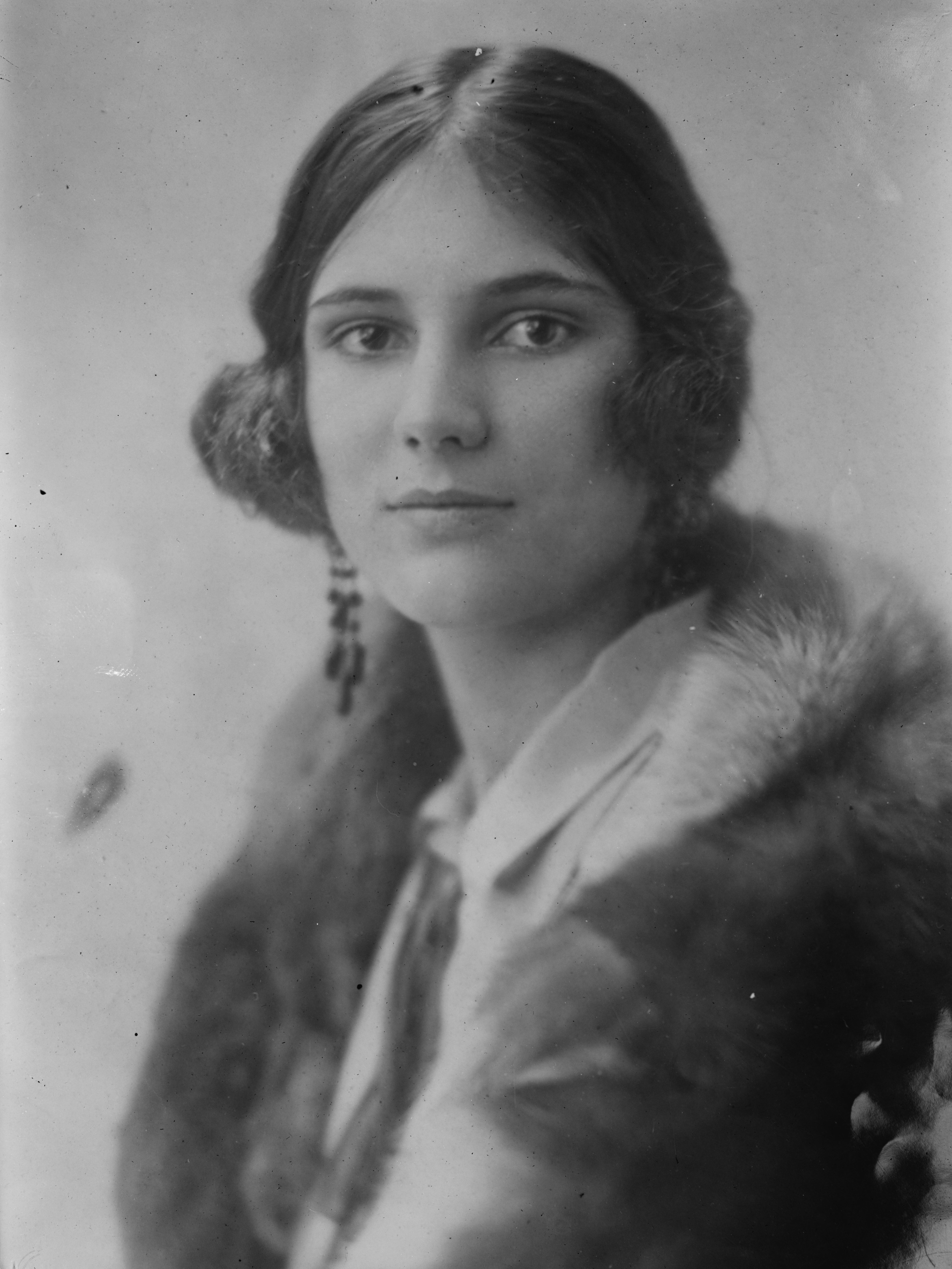
- Born: January 9, 1877; Pittsburgh, Pennsylvania, US
- Died: January 9, 1942 (aged 65); Rift Valley Province, Kenya
- Spouses: George Lauder Carnegie (m. 1898; died 1921) Roger, Comte de Périgny (m. 1923)
- Parents: William Thaw Sr. Mary Sibbet Copley

Margaret Copley Thaw, Comtesse de Périgny (January 9, 1877 – January 9, 1942) was an American socialite and philanthropist.

== Biography ==
Thaw was born on January 3, 1877, to William Thaw and Mary Sibbet Copley. In 1898, she married George Lauder Carnegie (1876–1921), the nephew of industrialist Andrew Carnegie.

In Paris on November 12, 1923, she married Roger, Comte de Périgny. After they married, the couple lived at the Plaza Hotel in New York. In 1924, she was sued by Madeline Helen Modica of Newark over an apparent affair with Madeline's husband, Emmanuel Victor Modica, a car salesman. They later moved abroad and spent their time between his Paris home and the farm and estate they built in 1926 on land at the Lake Naivasha known as Kongoni Farm. The farm was a 15,600 acre ranch.

She died on January 9, 1942, at Kongoni Farm in what was then the British East African colony of Kenya. The farm and a life interest in her $2,000,000 estate was left to her husband.
