= Sarony (disambiguation) =

Napoleon Sarony (1821–1896) was a popular American photographer and lithographer.

Sarony may also refer to:

- Leslie Sarony (1897–1985), British entertainer, singer and songwriter
- Otto Sarony (1850–1903), American photographer, son of Napoleon Sarony
- Burrow-Giles Lithographic Co. v. Sarony, an 1894 U.S. Supreme Court decision
