= Gallienne =

Gallienne or Le Gallienne is a surname. Notable people with the surname include:

- Eva Le Gallienne (1899–1991), British-born American actress, producer, director, translator, and author, daughter of Richard
- Guillaume Gallienne (born 1972), French actor, screenwriter and film director
- Gwen Le Gallienne (c.1898–1966), English painter and sculptor, step-daughter of Richard
- Richard Le Gallienne (1866–1947), English author and poet
