= Still the Drums =

Still the Drums is a 2009 film written, produced, directed and edited by actor Talbot Perry Simons. The film is about four best friends that went to Vietnam as U.S. Marines. The story takes place thirty-nine years after the end of the Vietnam War.

The title Still the Drums is an excerpt from the poem "The Illusion of War" written after the Civil war by English author Richard Le Gallienne.

Still the Drums premiered on August 1, 2009, at the Regency Fairfax Cinema on Beverly Blvd. In West Hollywood, California, it was selected as a finalist in the 2009 New York International Independent Film and Video Festival, where it won awards for Best Film, Best Directorial Debut, Best Actor, Best Screenplay and Best New Song Composer. Still the Drums also won the Platinum Reel for Standout Filmmaking at the 2010 Nevada Film Festival.

His first film, it premiered on U.S. Cable TV's Movies On Demand Pay Per View in January 2013.
