= Ames v. Kansas ex rel. Johnston =

- Supreme Court of the United States

Decided April 21, 1884
- Full case name: Ames v. Kansas ex rel. Johnston
- Citations: 111 U.S. 449 (more)

Holding
- Congress may grant inferior courts concurrent jurisdiction over issues where the Supreme Court has original jurisdiction as long as the issue is not required by the Constitution to be filed directly in the Supreme Court.

Court membership
- Chief Justice Morrison Waite Associate Justices Samuel F. Miller · Stephen J. Field; Joseph P. Bradley · John M. Harlan; William B. Woods · Stanley Matthews; Horace Gray · Samuel Blatchford

Case opinion
- Majority: Waite, joined by unanimous

Ames v. Kansas ex rel. Johnston, 111 U.S. 449 (1884), was a United States Supreme Court case in which the Court held that Congress may grant inferior courts concurrent jurisdiction over issues where the Supreme Court has original jurisdiction as long as the issue is not required by the Constitution to be filed directly in the Supreme Court.
