= New England Mutual Life Insurance Co. v. Woodworth =

- Supreme Court of the United States

Argued March 18, 1884 Decided March 31, 1884
- Full case name: New England Mutual Life Insurance Company v. Woodworth, Adm'r etc.
- Citations: 111 U.S. 138 (more) 4 S. Ct. 364; 28 L. Ed. 379

Holding
- Reaffirmed the general rule that simple contract debts, such as a policy of insurance not under seal, are, for the purpose of founding administration, assets where the debtor resides, without regard to the place where the policy is found.

Court membership
- Chief Justice Morrison Waite Associate Justices Samuel F. Miller · Stephen J. Field; Joseph P. Bradley · John M. Harlan; William B. Woods · Stanley Matthews; Horace Gray · Samuel Blatchford

Case opinion
- Majority: Blatchford, joined by unanimous

New England Mutual Life Insurance Co. v. Woodworth, 111 U.S. 138 (1884), was a U.S. Supreme Court case.

== The case ==
On September 21, 1869, Ann E. Woodworth took out a life insurance policy on herself with the New England Mutual Life Insurance Company in Michigan. Her husband Stephen E. Woodworth was the beneficiary. She then died in New York, and her husband moved to Illinois. The company did not pay the policy, and he sued in Illinois. The Illinois court passed judgment against the insurance company. The insurance company appealed saying that the suit should not have been filed in Illinois.

The Supreme Court reaffirmed the general rule that simple contract debts, such as a policy of insurance not under seal, are, for the purpose of founding administration, assets where the debtor resides, without regard to the place where the policy is found.

== Used as precedent ==
This case was used as a precedent in 8 SCOTUS cases and 21 cases by other courts. The SCOTUS precedent citations include:

- Southern Pacific Co. v. Denton (1892)
- Shaw v. Quincy Mining Co. (1892),
- Fitzgerald & Mallory Constr. Co. v. Fitzgerald (1890)
- Barrow SS Co. v. Kane (1898),
- In Re the Louisville Underwriters (1890)
- In Re Keasbey & Mattison Co. (1895)
- Equitable Life Assurance Soc. v. Brown (1902)
- Connecticut Mut. Life Ins. Co. V. Moore (1948)

== Side effect of the case ==
The plaintiff, Stephen E. Woodworth, was both the Step-Father and Uncle of noted entomologist Charles W. Woodworth. C.W. Woodworth's mother became a widow and married her late husband's brother who was a widower. The judgment arrived when C.W. Woodworth was 19 and likely helped pay for his education at the University of Illinois.

== See also ==
- Metropolitan Life Insurance Company – acquired New England Mutual in 1996
- List of United States Supreme Court cases, volume 111
