= Clio Hinton Bracken =

American sculptor (1870–1925)

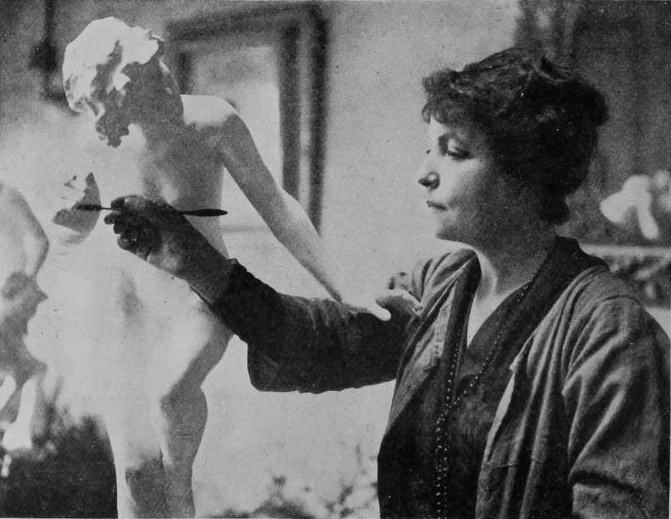
- Born: Cleora Hinton; July 26, 1869; Rhinebeck, New York, U.S.
- Died: February 12, 1925 (aged 54); Manhattan, New York
- Known for: Sculpture
- Spouse(s): James Huneker (1892-1899; divorced); William Barrie Bracken (m. 1900)
- Children: 3

Cleora "Clio" Hinton Bracken (née Hinton, formerly Huneker; July 26, 1869 – February 12, 1925) was an American sculptor.

A native of Rhinebeck, New York, Bracken studied with Augustus Saint-Gaudens.

Bracken was born to Howard Hinton, an editor at the Home Journal, and Lucy (Brownson) Hinton, a painter and sculptor. She shared studio space with her cousin Roland Hinton Perry. Clio's sister, Irma, was the mother of artist Gwen Le Gallienne. She was known for her portraits, including those of such figures as John J. Pershing, John C. Frémont, Henri Farré, and Gabriele d'Annunzio.

Her studio was located in Greenwich Village. She died at her home at Washington Square Park in Manhattan.

== Legacy ==
A statue of Chloe is in the collection of Brookgreen Gardens, a sculpture garden and wildlife preserve in South Carolina.
