= List of United States Supreme Court cases, volume 111 =

Supreme Court of the United States
- Interactive map of Supreme Court of the United States
- 38°53′26″N 77°00′16″W
- Established: March 4, 1789; 236 years ago
- Location: Washington, D.C.
- Coordinates: 38°53′26″N 77°00′16″W
- Composition method: Presidential nomination with Senate confirmation
- Authorised by: Constitution of the United States, Art. III, § 1
- Judge term length: life tenure, subject to impeachment and removal
- Number of positions: 9 (by statute)
- Website: supremecourt.gov

This is a list of cases reported in volume 111 of United States Reports, decided by the Supreme Court of the United States in 1884.

== Justices of the Supreme Court at the time of volume 111 U.S. ==
The Supreme Court is established by Article III, Section 1 of the Constitution of the United States, which says: "The judicial Power of the United States, shall be vested in one supreme Court . . .". The size of the Court is not specified; the Constitution leaves it to Congress to set the number of justices. Under the Judiciary Act of 1789 Congress originally fixed the number of justices at six (one chief justice and five associate justices). Since 1789 Congress has varied the size of the Court from six to seven, nine, ten, and back to nine justices (always including one chief justice).

When the cases in volume 111 U.S. were decided the Court comprised the following nine members:

Portrait	Justice	Office	Home State	Succeeded	Date confirmed by the Senate (Vote)	Tenure on Supreme Court
	Morrison Waite	Chief Justice	Ohio	Salmon P. Chase	January 21, 1874 (63–0)	March 4, 1874 – March 23, 1888 (Died)
	Samuel Freeman Miller	Associate Justice	Iowa	Peter Vivian Daniel	July 16, 1862 (Acclamation)	July 21, 1862 – October 13, 1890 (Died)
	Stephen Johnson Field	Associate Justice	California	newly created seat	March 10, 1863 (Acclamation)	May 10, 1863 – December 1, 1897 (Retired)
	Joseph P. Bradley	Associate Justice	New Jersey	newly created seat	March 21, 1870 (46–9)	March 23, 1870 – January 22, 1892 (Died)
	John Marshall Harlan	Associate Justice	Kentucky	David Davis	November 29, 1877 (Acclamation)	December 10, 1877 – October 14, 1911 (Died)
	William Burnham Woods	Associate Justice	Georgia	William Strong	December 21, 1880 (39–8)	January 5, 1881 – May 14, 1887 (Died)
	Stanley Matthews	Associate Justice	Ohio	Noah Haynes Swayne	May 12, 1881 (24–23)	May 17, 1881 – March 22, 1889 (Died)
	Horace Gray	Associate Justice	Massachusetts	Nathan Clifford	December 20, 1881 (51–5)	January 9, 1882 – September 15, 1902 (Died)
	Samuel Blatchford	Associate Justice	New York	Ward Hunt	March 22, 1882 (Acclamation)	April 3, 1882 – July 7, 1893 (Died)

== Notable Case in 111 U.S. ==
=== Burrow-Giles Lithographic Co. v. Sarony ===
In Burrow-Giles Lithographic Co. v. Sarony, 111 U.S. 53 (1884), the Supreme Court upheld the power of Congress to extend copyright protection to photography. Regarding the interpretation of "writings" in the Constitution, the Court held that Congress has "properly declared these to include all forms of writing, printing, engraving, etching, &c., by which the ideas in the mind of the author are given visible expression". The Court noted that "maps and charts" were among the subjects of the first Copyright Act of 1790, and that etchings and engravings were added when it was first amended in 1802. The members of Congress that passed these first copyright acts were contemporaries of the Framers of the Constitution, and many of them attended the Constitutional Convention itself. As such, their interpretation of the Constitution, the Court decided, "is of itself entitled to very great weight, and when it is remembered that the rights thus established have not been disputed during a period of nearly a century, it is almost conclusive".

== Citation style ==
Under the Judiciary Act of 1789 the federal court structure at the time comprised District Courts, which had general trial jurisdiction; Circuit Courts, which had mixed trial and appellate (from the US District Courts) jurisdiction; and the United States Supreme Court, which had appellate jurisdiction over the federal District and Circuit courts—and for certain issues over state courts. The Supreme Court also had limited original jurisdiction (i.e., in which cases could be filed directly with the Supreme Court without first having been heard by a lower federal or state court). There were one or more federal District Courts and/or Circuit Courts in each state, territory, or other geographical region.

Bluebook citation style is used for case names, citations, and jurisdictions.

- "C.C.D." = United States Circuit Court for the District of . . .
  - e.g.,"C.C.D.N.J." = United States Circuit Court for the District of New Jersey
- "D." = United States District Court for the District of . . .
  - e.g.,"D. Mass." = United States District Court for the District of Massachusetts
- "E." = Eastern; "M." = Middle; "N." = Northern; "S." = Southern; "W." = Western
  - e.g.,"C.C.S.D.N.Y." = United States Circuit Court for the Southern District of New York
  - e.g.,"M.D. Ala." = United States District Court for the Middle District of Alabama
- "Ct. Cl." = United States Court of Claims
- The abbreviation of a state's name alone indicates the highest appellate court in that state's judiciary at the time.
  - e.g.,"Pa." = Supreme Court of Pennsylvania
  - e.g.,"Me." = Supreme Judicial Court of Maine

== List of cases in volume 111 U.S. ==
Case Name	Page and year	Opinion of the Court	Concurring opinion(s)	Dissenting opinion(s)	Lower court	Disposition
Otoe County v. Baldwin	1 (1884)	Blatchford	none	none	C.C.D. Neb.	affirmed
Lammon v. Feusier	17 (1884)	Gray	none	none	C.C.D. Nev.	affirmed
Swift Company v. United States	22 (1884)	Matthews	none	none	Ct. Cl.	reversed
Walsh v. J.D. Mayer and Company	31 (1884)	Matthews	none	none	C.C.S.D. Miss.	reversed
United States v. Ulrici	38 (1884)	Woods	none	none	C.C.E.D. Mo.	affirmed
United States v. Sutton	42 (1884)	Woods	none	none	not indicated	affirmed
Ex parte Virginia	43 (1884)	Harlan	none	none	original	mandamus denied
Stevens v. Griffith	48 (1884)	Field	none	none	Tenn.	reversed
Burrow-Giles Lithographic Company v. Sarony	53 (1884)	Miller	none	none	C.C.S.D.N.Y.	affirmed
Hollister v. Zion's Co-Operative Mercantile Institute	62 (1884)	Waite	none	none	Sup. Ct. Terr. Utah	affirmed
Canal Bank v. Hudson	66 (1884)	Blatchford	none	none	C.C.S.D. Miss.	affirmed
Dixon County v. Field	83 (1884)	Matthews	none	none	C.C.D. Neb.	reversed
McMurray v. D.D. Mallory and Company	97 (1884)	Woods	none	none	C.C.D. Md.	affirmed
Taylor v. Bowker	110 (1884)	Harlan	none	none	C.C.D. Me.	affirmed
Moore v. Page	117 (1884)	Field	none	none	C.C.N.D. Ill.	affirmed
Garretson v. Clark	120 (1884)	Field	none	none	C.C.N.D.N.Y.	affirmed
Black v. Thorne	122 (1884)	Field	none	none	C.C.S.D.N.Y.	affirmed
Phoenix Bank v. Risley	125 (1884)	Miller	none	none	N.Y.	affirmed
Chesapeake and Ohio Railway Company v. White	134 (1884)	Waite	none	none	W. Va.	stay denied
New England Mutual Life Insurance Company v. Woodworth	138 (1884)	Blatchford	none	none	C.C.S.D. Ill.	affirmed
Cooper and Company v. Schlesinger	148 (1884)	Blatchford	none	none	C.C.N.D. Ohio	affirmed
Moores v. Citizens' National Bank	156 (1884)	Gray	none	none	C.C.S.D. Ohio	affirmed
Ware v. Galveston City Company	170 (1884)	Matthews	none	none	C.C.E.D. Tex.	affirmed
Covell v. Heyman	176 (1884)	Matthews	none	none	Mich.	reversed
Rosenthal v. Walker	185 (1884)	Woods	none	none	C.C.D. La.	affirmed
Stephens v. Monongahela National Bank	197 (1884)	Waite	none	none	C.C.W.D. Pa.	affirmed
Chouteau v. Gibson	200 (1884)	Waite	none	none	Mo.	dismissed
Astor v. Merritt	202 (1884)	Blatchford	none	none	C.C.S.D.N.Y.	reversed
Burley v. German-American Bank	216 (1884)	Blatchford	none	none	C.C.S.D.N.Y.	affirmed
Drury v. Hayden	223 (1884)	Gray	none	none	C.C.N.D. Ill.	reversed
Hayes v. Michigan Central Railroad Company	228 (1884)	Matthews	none	none	C.C.N.D. Ill.	reversed
Teal v. Walker	242 (1884)	Woods	none	none	C.C.D. Or.	reversed
Boers v. Preston	252 (1884)	Harlan	Gray	none	C.C.S.D.N.Y.	reversed
Lovell v. St. Louis Mutual Life Insurance Company	264 (1884)	Bradley	none	none	C.C.M.D. Tenn.	reversed
Rector v. Gibbon	276 (1884)	Field	none	Waite	C.C.E.D. Ark.	reversed
Cochrane v. Badische Anilin Soda Fabrik	293 (1884)	Blatchford	none	none	C.C.S.D.N.Y.	reversed
Armour v. Hahn	313 (1884)	Gray	none	none	C.C.D. Kan.	reversed
Turner and Seymour Manufacturing Company v. Dover Stamping Company	319 (1884)	Matthews	none	none	C.C.D. Conn.	reversed
Irvine v. Dunham	327 (1884)	Woods	none	none	C.C.D. Cal.	affirmed
Moulor v. American Life Insurance Co.	335 (1884)	Harlan	none	none	C.C.E.D. Pa.	reversed
United States v. Carpenter	347 (1884)	Field	none	none	C.C.D. Minn.	reversed
Chambers v. Harrington	350 (1884)	Miller	none	none	Sup. Ct. Terr. Utah	affirmed
Eilers v. Boatman	356 (1884)	Miller	none	none	Sup. Ct. Terr. Utah	affirmed
Houston and Texas Central Railway Company v. Shirley	358 (1884)	Waite	none	none	C.C.N.D. Tex.	affirmed
Santa Cruz County v. Santa Cruz Railroad Company	361 (1884)	Waite	none	none	Cal.	dismissed
Blair v. Cuming County	363 (1884)	Blatchford	none	none	C.C.D. Neb.	reversed
Stewart v. Hoyt's Executors	373 (1884)	Gray	none	none	C.C.E.D. Wis.	affirmed
Mansfield, Coldwater and Lake Michigan Railroad Company v. Swan, Rose and Company	379 (1884)	Matthews	none	none	C.C.N.D. Ohio	reversed
Hornbuckle v. Stafford	389 (1884)	Woods	none	none	Sup. Ct. Terr. Mont.	affirmed
Gaines v. Miller	395 (1884)	Woods	none	none	C.C.E.D. Mo.	affirmed
Claiborne County v. Brooks	400 (1884)	Bradley	none	none	C.C.E.D. Tenn.	reversed
Slidell v. Grandjean	412 (1884)	Field	none	none	C.C.E.D. La.	affirmed
Corn Exchange National Bank v. Scheppers Brothers	440 (1884)	Miller	none	none	C.C.E.D. Pa.	reversed
Quinn v. Chapman	445 (1884)	Miller	none	none	Cal.	affirmed
Ames v. Kansas ex rel. Johnston	449 (1884)	Waite	none	none	C.C.D. Kan.	reversed
Alley v. Nott	472 (1884)	Waite	none	none	C.C.S.D.N.Y.	affirmed
United States v. Bell	477 (1884)	Waite	none	none	N.D. Miss.	reversed
Anderson v. Philadelphia Warehouse Company	479 (1884)	Waite	none	Miller	C.C.E.D. Pa.	affirmed
Texas and Pacific Railway Company v. Kirk	486 (1884)	Waite	none	none	Tex.	conditional dismissal
Texas and Pacific Railway Company v. Murphy	488 (1884)	Waite	none	none	Tex.	dismissal denied
Eagleton Manufacturing Company v. West, Bradley and Carey Manufacturing Company	490 (1884)	Blatchford	none	none	C.C.S.D.N.Y.	affirmed
United States v. Bryant	499 (1884)	Blatchford	none	none	C.C.S.D. Ala.	reversed
Pacific Railroad of Missouri v. Missouri Pacific Railway Company	505 (1884)	Blatchford	none	none	C.C.E.D. Mo.	reversed
Barrett v. Failing	523 (1884)	Gray	none	none	C.C.D. Or.	affirmed
Thompson v. First National Bank	529 (1884)	Gray	none	none	C.C.N.D. Ohio	reversed
Spindle v. Shreve	542 (1884)	Matthews	none	none	C.C.N.D. Ill.	affirmed
Thorwegan v. King	549 (1884)	Matthews	none	none	C.C.E.D. Mo.	reversed
Carroll County v. Smith	556 (1884)	Matthews	none	none	C.C.N.D. Miss.	affirmed
Colt v. Colt	566 (1884)	Matthews	none	none	C.C.D. Conn.	affirmed
Mobile and Montgomery Railway Company v. Jurey	584 (1884)	Woods	none	none	C.C.M.D. Ala.	affirmed
Gibbs and Sterrett Manufacturing Company v. Brucker	597 (1884)	Woods	none	none	C.C.E.D. Wis.	reversed
Phillips v. City of Detroit	604 (1884)	Woods	none	none	C.C.E.D. Mich.	affirmed
Carver v. United States	609 (1884)	Harlan	none	none	Ct. Cl.	affirmed
Connecticut Mutual Life Insurance Company v. Lathrop	612 (1884)	Harlan	none	none	C.C.W.D. Mo.	affirmed
Robb v. Connolly	624 (1884)	Harlan	none	none	Cal.	affirmed
Johnson v. Waters	640 (1884)	Bradley	none	none	C.C.D. La.	decree modified
Hennequin and Company v. Clews and Company	676 (1884)	Bradley	none	none	N.Y.	affirmed
Williams v. Morgan	684 (1884)	Bradley	none	none	C.C.D. La.	multiple
Hagar v. Reclamation District No. 108	701 (1884)	Field	none	none	C.C.D. Cal.	affirmed
Louisiana ex rel. Nelson v. St. Martin Parish	716 (1884)	Field	none	none	La.	reversed
Hitz v. National Metropolitan Bank	722 (1884)	Miller	none	none	Sup. Ct. D.C.	reversed
Badger v. Gutierez	734 (1884)	Miller	none	none	C.C.E.D. La.	affirmed
Factors' and Traders' Insurance Company v. Murphy	738 (1884)	Miller	none	none	La.	reversed
Butchers' Union Slaughter-House and Live-Stock Landing Company v. Crescent City Live-Stock Landing and Slaughter-House Company	746 (1884)	Miller	Field; Bradley	none	C.C.E.D. La.	reversed
Ex parte Hitz	766 (1884)	Waite	none	none	Sup. Ct. D.C.	certiorari denied
City of San Francisco v. Scott	768 (1884)	Waite	none	none	Cal.	dismissed
Edrington v. Jefferson	770 (1884)	Waite	none	none	E.D. Ark.	reversed
Greenhood v. Randall	775 (1884)	Waite	none	none	not indicated	affirmed
Burnham v. Bowen	776 (1884)	Waite	none	none	C.C.D. Iowa	affirmed
Nickle v. Stewart	776 (1884)	Waite	none	none	D.W. Va.	affirmed
Killian v. Clark	784 (1884)	Waite	none	none	Sup. Ct. D.C.	dismissed
White v. Knox	784 (1884)	Waite	none	none	Sup. Ct. D.C.	affirmed
St Paul, Minneapolis and Manitoba Railway Company v. Burton	788 (1884)	Waite	none	none	C.C.D. Minn.	affirmed
Baines v. Clarke	789 (1884)	Waite	none	none	C.C.D.W. Va.	reversed
Harrington v. Holler	796 (1884)	Waite	none	none	Sup. Ct. Terr. Wash.	dismissed
Friend v. Wise	797 (1884)	Waite	none	none	C.C.D. Cal.	dismissal denied
Killian v. Ebbinghaus	798 (1884)	Waite	none	none	original	error corrected
