= James Huneker =

American art, literary and music critic

James Gibbons Huneker
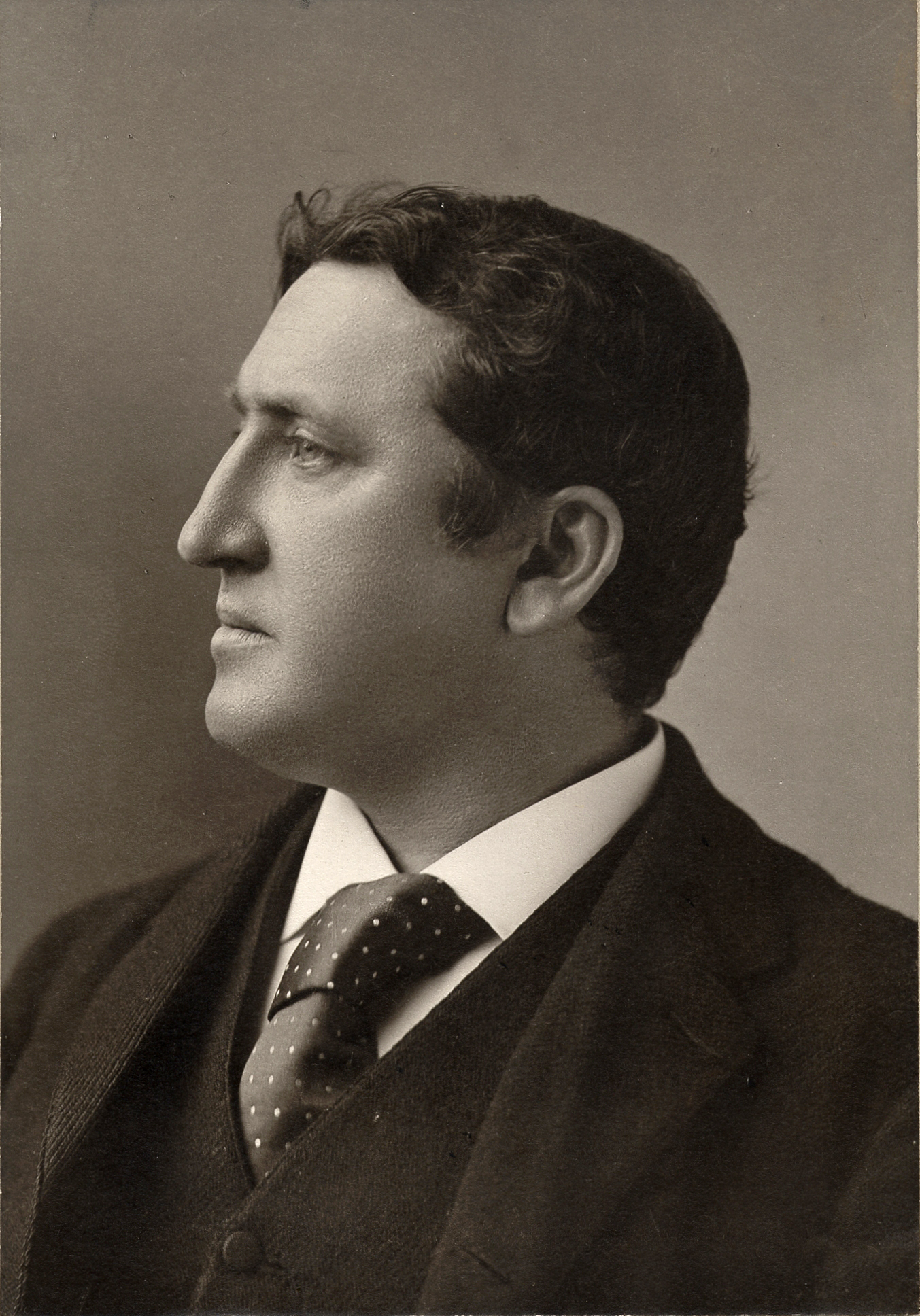
- James Huneker, c. 1890, photo by Napoleon Sarony
- Born: January 31, 1857; Philadelphia, Pennsylvania, U.S.
- Died: February 9, 1921 (aged 64); New York City, New York, U.S.
- Occupations: Author, critic
- Years active: 19th and 20th centuries
- Spouse(s): Clio Hinton (1892–1899; divorced); Elizabeth Huneker
- Children: 3

James Gibbons Huneker (January 31, 1857 – February 9, 1921) was an American art, book, music, and theater critic. A colorful individual and an ambitious writer, he was "an American with a great mission," in the words of his friend, the critic Benjamin De Casseres, and that mission was to educate Americans about the best cultural achievements, native and European, of his time. From 1892 to 1899, he was the husband of the sculptor Clio Hinton.

== Biography ==
Huneker was born in Philadelphia. Forced by his parents to study law, he knew that a legal career was not what he wanted; he was passionately interested in music and writing, hoping one day to be a concert pianist and a novelist. At twenty-one, he abandoned his office job and Philadelphia ties and (with his pregnant girlfriend, then wife) left for Paris, telling his parents that he was departing only the night before the ship sailed.

On a tight budget supplemented with money his parents sent, he studied piano under Leopold Doutreleau in Paris and audited the piano class of Frédéric Chopin's pupil Georges Mathias. He also began a lifelong immersion in European art and literature and was thrilled to catch sight on his wanderings through the city of Victor Hugo, Ivan Turgenev, Gustave Flaubert, Guy de Maupassant, and Émile Zola as well as Édouard Manet and Edgar Degas. That year abroad changed Huneker's life.

Huneker, his wife and daughter returned to Philadelphia the following year, but he was never happy again in his native city and longed for the wider stage of New York, where he hoped to try his luck as a journalist while he continued his study of music. His first daughter died in 1880, and a second died in 1883. In 1886, he moved to New York City, abandoning his wife. There he scraped by, giving piano lessons and living a downtown bohemian life, while he studied with Franz Liszt's student Rafael Joseffy, who became his friend and mentor. (Huneker's musical gods were Liszt, Chopin, and Brahms. He published a biography of Chopin in 1900 and wrote the commentary on Chopin's complete works for Schirmer's music publishing company. His analysis of the piano solo works of Johannes Brahms, written shortly after that composer's complete works were published posthumously, is still highly regarded.) By the 1890s, after finally giving up his dream of a music career for himself, he was working full-time as a freelance critic responsible for covering the music, art, and theater scene of New York. A voracious reader, he also became a prolific and entertaining book reviewer.

In the history of American journalism, Huneker is principally associated with the New York Sun, a lively, respected New York daily which prided itself on its opinionated political commentary and extensive coverage of the arts. He was the paper's music critic from 1900–1902 and its art critic from 1906–1912. He also published in a range of high-circulation and small-press journals, both mainstream and avant-garde, over a thirty-year period: e.g., Harper's Bazaar, M'lle. New York, Metropolitan Magazine, North American Review, Puck, Reedy's Mirror, Scribner's Magazine, The Smart Set, Theatre and Town Topics. His reviews, columns, and interviews with major artistic figures from various magazines and newspapers were reprinted in several books published by Charles Scribner between 1904 and 1920.

Yearly trips to Europe throughout his life also afforded James Gibbons Huneker the opportunity to report to Americans on new developments in the visual and performing arts. In an age of largely parochial criticism, he was more sophisticated and knowledgeable about modern art and music than many of his colleagues, and he saw himself as a someone who was explicitly working for America's cultural coming-of-age.

Huneker was known for his passionate enthusiasms, self-taught erudition, and sometimes extravagant prose style. Gustave Moreau's art "recalls an antique chryselephantine statue, a being rigid with precious gems, pasted with strange colors...yet charged with the author's magnetism...possessing a strange feverish beauty." A critic was one who "sits down to a Barmecide feast, to see, to smell, but not to taste the celestial manna vouchsafed by the gods." At other times, Huneker wrote with admirable brevity and acuity: Ernest Lawson's landscapes were created with "a palette of crushed jewels", and the Ash can painter George Luks was "the Charles Dickens of the East Side."

At a time when conservative tastes dominated American cultural life, he stated his credo boldly in a New York Sun column in 1908: "Let us try to shift the focus when a new man comes into our ken. Let us study each man according to his temperament and not ask ourselves whether he chimes in with other men's music. The giving of marks in schoolmaster's fashion should have become obsolete centuries ago. To miss modern art is to miss all the thrill and excitement our present life holds."

Part of Huneker's notoriety in his day was connected to the flamboyant persona he established. He was known as a tirelessly social man with an enormous capacity for liquor and stimulating conversation, which (given his extensive erotic experiences) could be quite ribald. His friend H. L. Mencken described his dinner table conversation as "a really amazing compound of scandalous anecdotes, shrewd judgments, and devastating witticisms." Numerous memoirs from the period recall him as an unforgettable personality.

Huneker's last years were spent in financially straitened circumstances. He continued reviewing concerts to the end of his life, but his freelance work, however prolific, had never afforded him a large income and the sales figures for his many books were moderate at best. He died in New York City of pneumonia in 1921, at the age of sixty-four. He was survived by his second wife, Clio Hinton, and their son Erik, with two daughters from his first marriage having predeceased their parents.

== Music critic ==
In the 1880s, Huneker served as the music editor of the Musical Courier, followed by stints with the New York Sun, the New York World, the New York Times, and the Philadelphia Press. In his columns, he proselytized for Richard Wagner, Claude Debussy, Richard Strauss and Arnold Schoenberg, long before their work was generally accepted, and wrote about all of the major conductors and opera singers of his time. He was a particular (sometimes obsessive) fan of the opera singer Mary Garden, renowned for her singing in Pelléas and Mélisande and Thais, whom he called "an orchidaceous Circe...the nearest approach to Duse on the lyric stage." He expressed reservations that have not stood the test of time, believing that the music of Giacomo Puccini and Sergei Prokofiev would eventually fall out of favor, but many of his judgments have proved prescient.

== Art critic ==
Though his love of Renaissance art, especially the Flemish realism of Hans Memling and Jan van Eyck, had been formed in his early trips to Europe and often guided his tastes, Huneker was appreciative of the new, more experimental art of Post-Impressionists like Paul Gauguin, Vincent van Gogh, Henri de Toulouse-Lautrec, Odilon Redon, and Henri Matisse and, among Americans, the modern artists of Alfred Stieglitz's circle (e.g., John Marin, Marsden Hartley), the African-American Impressionist Henry Ossawa Tanner, and the realists of the Ashcan School. He was close friends with the Ash Can painter George Luks, whom he regarded as one of the greatest of American painters. As one more radical school of art followed another in the pre-World War I period, though, Huneker's openness was sorely tested. The famous Armory Show of 1913, America's first large-scale introduction to modernism, presented him with formidable challenges; he did not find much to praise in Paul Cézanne or the Cubists, Futurists, or Dadaists. Picasso always remained a mystery to him, and he felt that his friend Alfred Stieglitz had made a grave mistake in exhibiting the work of the modern primitive Henri Rousseau, whose work he found "pathetically ludicrous."

== Literary critic ==
Huneker's support of the new realism of Theodore Dreiser, Stephen Crane, and Frank Norris put him in the forefront of literary critics c. 1900-1910; he was on particularly friendly terms with Dreiser, having praised Sister Carrie and helped Dreiser with his revisions of Jennie Gerhardt. A reader of eclectic tastes, he also wrote in praise of Friedrich Nietzsche, Anatole France, Thomas Hardy, George Moore, Maxim Gorky, Joseph Conrad, Edith Wharton, and Jules Laforgue. Forty years before the Henry James revival, he proclaimed James the greatest American novelist. He was the first American literary critic to review, in 1917, James Joyce's A Portrait of the Artist as a Young Man. He was energetically outspoken about literary censorship and the failure of American publishers to provide readers with the sophisticated publications literate Europeans took for granted. He was uncomfortable on the subject of homosexuality, however, which left him in the end feeling skeptical about the merits of Walt Whitman and Oscar Wilde. (Huneker was a fiction writer himself, publishing two volumes of short stories, Melomaniacs and Visionaries, and in the last year of his life published a racy novel, Painted Veils.)

== Theater critic ==
Huneker's tastes in drama were particularly modern. He recommended Henrik Ibsen, August Strindberg, Anton Chekhov, George Bernard Shaw (intermittently), Gerhart Hauptmann, Arthur Schnitzler, and Frank Wedekind to American audiences long before most theatergoers were ready to accept their works. Wedekind's Spring's Awakening especially appealed to him as "a milestone in the modern theater's fight against sexual taboos." He took particular pleasure in describing and praising the talented actresses of the day (e.g., Sarah Bernhardt, Eleanora Duse, Alla Nazimova, Julia Marlowe, Minnie Fiske) when they took on challenging roles. He deplored the fact that the American stage was largely given up to "eye and ear tickling" while a dramatic renaissance was taking place abroad. Edith Wharton, who regularly read his reviews, thought Huneker "a breath of fresh air blowing through the stale atmosphere of the theatre."

== Publications ==
- Mezzotints in Modern Music (1899)
- Chopin: The Man and His Music (1900)
- Melomaniacs (1902)
- Overtones (1904)
- Iconoclasts (1905)
- Visionaries (1905)
- Egoists: A Book of Supermen (1909)
- Promenades of an Impressionist (1910)
- Franz Liszt (1911)
- The Pathos of Distance (1913)
- Old Fogy (1913)
- Ivory Apes and Peacocks (1915)
- New Cosmopolis (1915)
- The Philharmonic Society of New York and its Seventy-Fifth Anniversary: A retrospect (1917)
- Unicorns (1917)
- Bedouins (1920)
- Painted Veils (1920)
- Steeplejack (1920)
- Variations (1921)
- Intimate Letters of James Gibbons Huneker (1924)
- Painted Veils (reissued with a preface by Benjamin De Casseres, 1942)

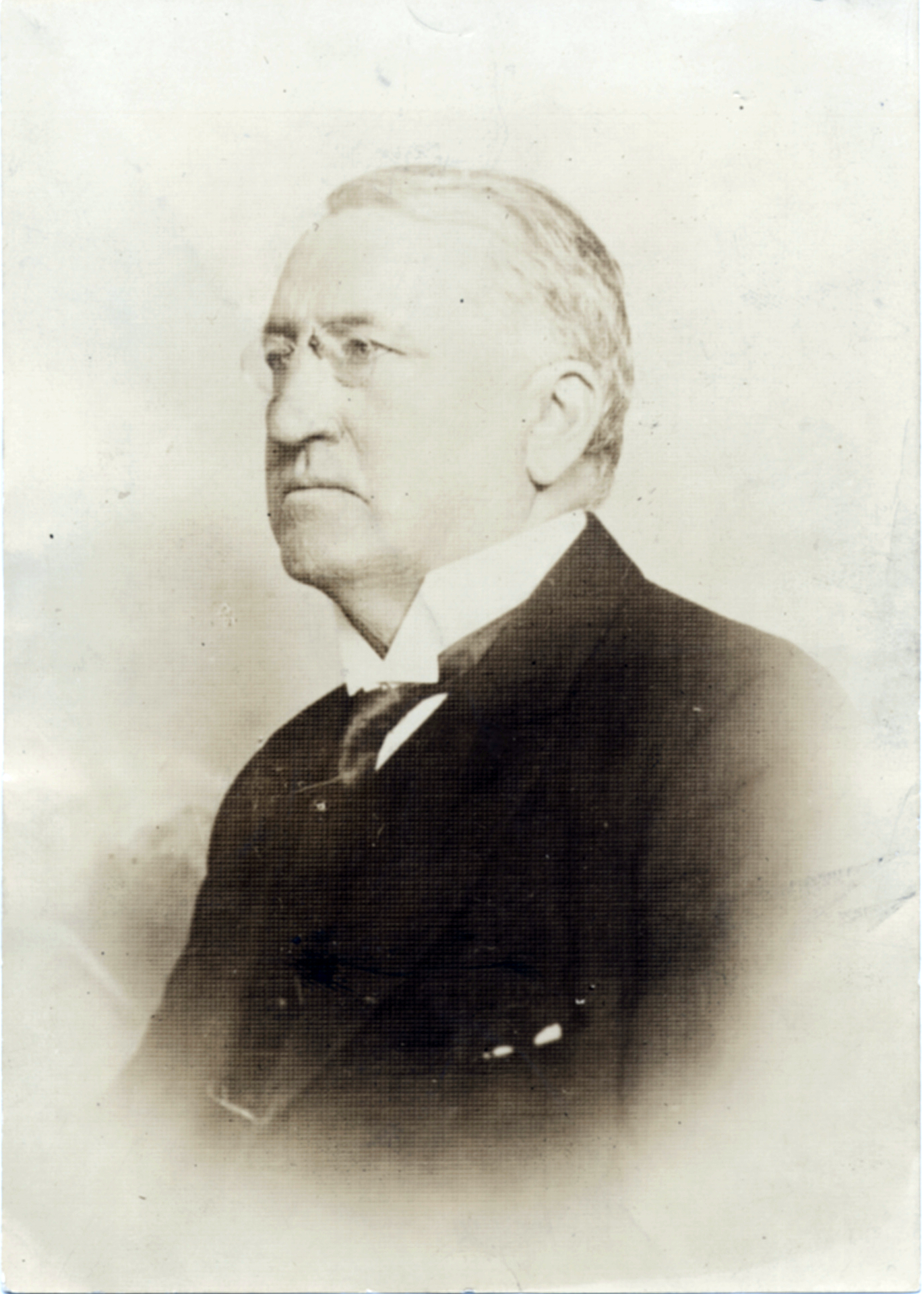
James Huneker in 1915

== The "huneker" ==
Following Huneker's comment about Chopin's Étude Op. 25, No. 11 that "[small]-souled men, no matter how agile their fingers, should avoid it", Douglas Hofstadter, in his book I Am a Strange Loop, named the unit by which "soul size" is measured the huneker (lower case).

== Reputation ==
Few American critics have elicited the adulation that was felt by other writers toward Huneker in his lifetime and immediately after his death. "There was no one like him," art critic Henry McBride wrote of Huneker. "His strength lay in his knowledge of life and his ability to write." Art historian Jerome Mellquist agreed, noting that "he could impart a grace and a quality of spiritual audacity unsurpassed by any critic of his generation." Benjamin De Casseres described him as a "perfect furnace of ideas and reading...an Olympian." Theater critic George Jean Nathan eulogized, "He taught us cosmopolitanism....He made possible civilized criticism in this great, prosperous prairie."

== Sources ==
- Casseres, Benjamin de. James Gibbons Huneker. New York: Joseph Lawren, 1925.
- Karlen, Arno (1981). "Huneker and Other Lost Arts". The Antioch Review. 39 (4): 402–421. doi:10.2307/4638487. JSTOR 4638487.
- Loughery, John. "The New York Sun and Modern Art in America: Charles Fitzgerald, Frederick James Gregg, James Gibbons Huneker, Henry McBride." Arts Magazine (December 1984), pp. 77–82.
- Mencken, H.L. My Life as Author and Editor (edited by Jonathan Yardley). New York: Knopf, 1993.
- Schwab, Arnold. James Gibbons Huneker: Critic of the Seven Arts. Stanford, CA: Stanford University Press, 1963.
