= Napoléon Sarony =

American lithographer and photographer (1821–1896)

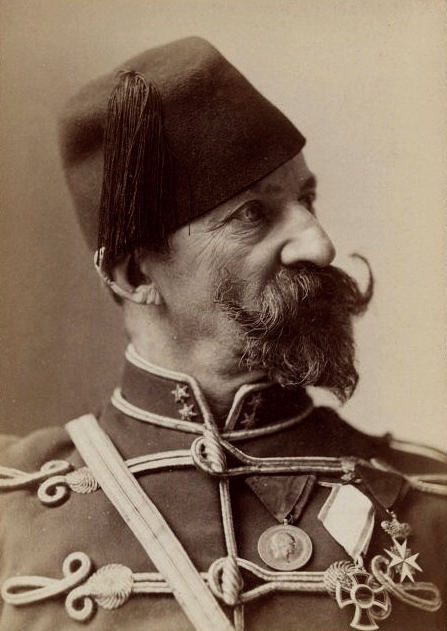
- Self-portrait, late 19th century
- Born: March 9, 1821; Quebec City, Lower Canada
- Died: November 9, 1896 (aged 75); New York City, U.S.
- Known for: Photography

Napoléon Sarony (March 9, 1821 – November 9, 1896) was a Canadian-born American lithographer and photographer. He was a highly popular portrait photographer, best known for his portraits of the stars of late-19th-century American theater. His son, Otto Sarony, continued the family business as a theater and film star photographer.

== Life ==
Sarony was born in 1821 in Quebec City, then in the British colony of Lower Canada, and moved to New York City around 1833. He worked as an illustrator for Currier and Ives before joining with James Major and starting his own lithography business, Sarony & Major, in 1843. In 1845, James Major was replaced in Sarony & Major by Henry B. Major, and the firm continued operating under that name until 1853. From 1853 to 1857, the firm was known as Sarony and Company, and from 1857 to 1867, as Sarony, Major & Knapp. Sarony left the firm in 1858 and traveled abroad for the next eight years. During that time, he learned the photographic portrait business from his brother Oliver Sarony who operated a popular portrait studio in Scarborough, England. Sarony established his own first portrait studio at 66 New Street in Birmingham, England around 1865. In June 1866, he returned to New York City. His first U.S. photographic studio was located at 680 Broadway. In 1876, he moved his operations to what became his more famous studio building at 37 Union Square. Photographers would pay their famous subjects to sit for them, and then retain full rights to sell the pictures. Sarony reportedly paid the internationally famous stage actress Sarah Bernhardt $1,500 to pose for his camera, equivalent to $53,750 in 2025. In 1894, he published a portfolio of prints entitled "Sarony's Living Pictures".

== Associations ==
Included among the thousands of people that came into Sarony's world were many distinguished people, such as American Civil War General William T. Sherman and literary figures Mark Twain, Lew Wallace and Oscar Wilde. Sarony also took a photograph of inventor Nikola Tesla that was later engraved by T. Johnson.

=== William T. Sherman ===
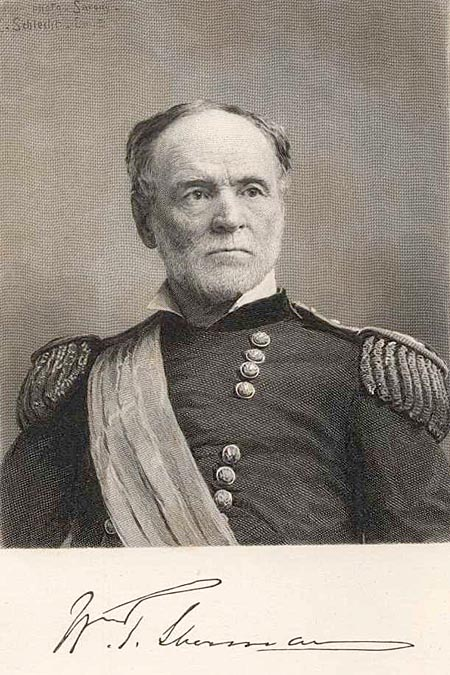
William T. Sherman (Sarony, 1888)

In 1888, Sarony photographed William T. Sherman, three years before he died in 1891. Sarony's photograph was used as a model for the engraving of the first Sherman Postage stamp.

=== Samuel Clemens; the Lotos, Salmagundi and Tile Clubs ===
Sarony took numerous photographs of Mark Twain. Twain and Sarony were in the same social circles and shared many acquaintances. They both belonged to the Lotos Club in New York City. Sarony helped in the founding of the Salmagundi Club, an association of artists, and was also a member of the Tile Club, whose members included well-known artists and journalists. In 1883, English author Wilkie Collins dedicated his anti-vivisection book Heart and Science to Sarony. In 1884, Sarony was a participant in an April Fool's joke played on Clemens when George Washington Cable arranged for 150 of Clemens's friends to write to him simultaneously, requesting his autograph. As part of the joke, no stamps or envelopes were to be provided for a reply.

=== Oscar Wilde ===
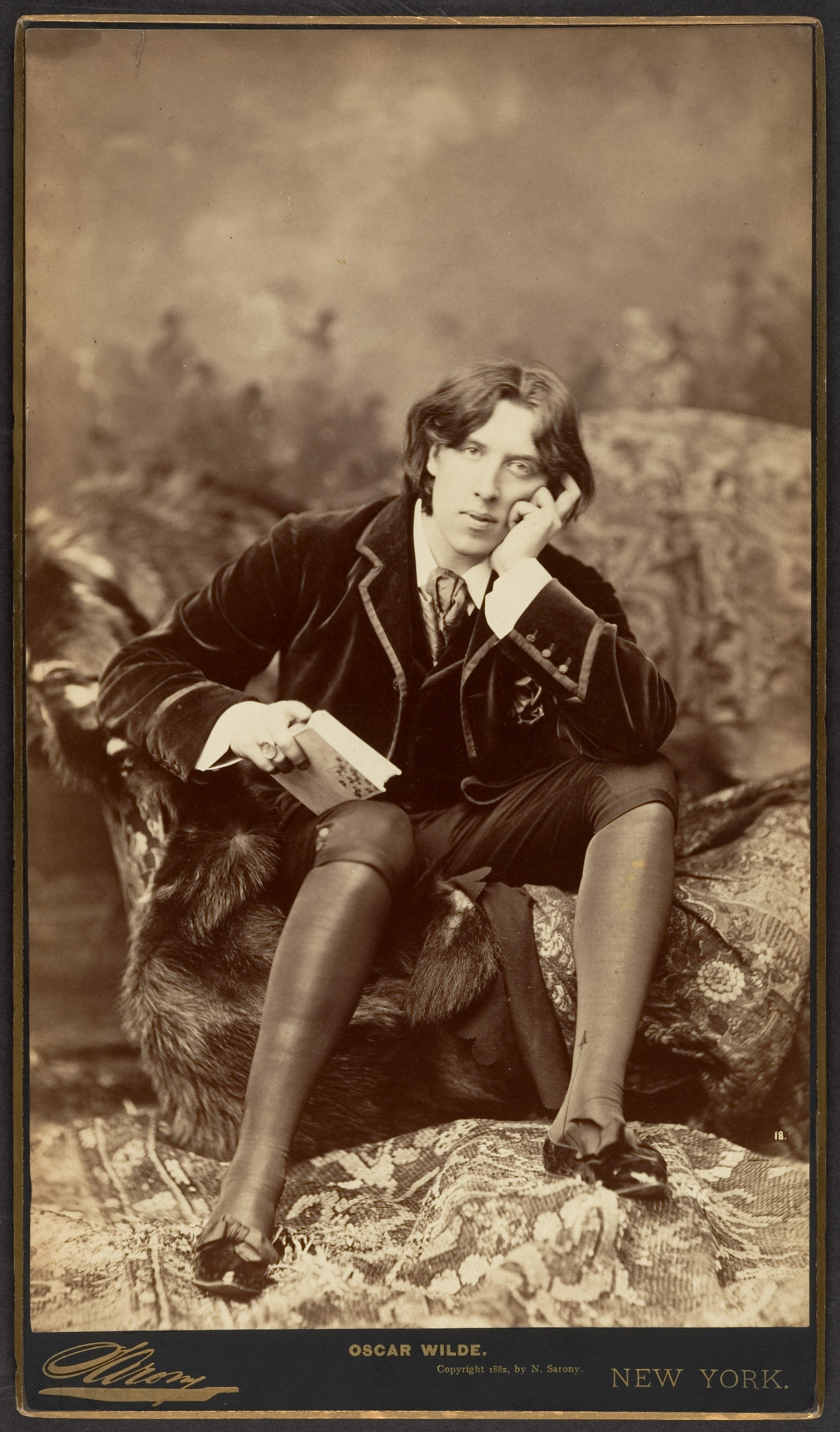
Oscar Wilde No. 18 (1882), the subject of Sarony's copyright infringement lawsuit that reached the U.S. Supreme Court

One of Sarony's portraits of writer Oscar Wilde became the subject of a U.S. Supreme Court case, Burrow-Giles Lithographic Co. v. Sarony 111 U.S. 53 (1884), in which the Court upheld the extension of copyright protection to photographs. Sarony sued Burrow-Giles after it used unauthorized lithographs of Oscar Wilde No. 18 in an advertisement, and won a judgment for $610 ($22,000 in modern dollars) that was affirmed on appeal by the Second Circuit Court of Appeals and the Supreme Court. Sarony later photographed the Supreme Court itself, to celebrate the centennial of the federal judiciary in 1890.

== Family ==
Sarony was married twice. His first wife, Ellen Major Sarony, died in 1858; his second wife, Louisa "Louie" Long Thomas Sarony (1838-1903), reportedly shared his tendency towards eccentricity and preference for outlandish dress. She rented elaborate costumes that she wore during her daily afternoon walk through Washington Square, wearing them once before returning them.

His brother, Oliver François Xavier Sarony (1820–1879), was also a portrait photographer, working primarily in England, who died in 1879. Napoleon's son, Otto (1850–1903), continued the business.

Sarony was buried in Green-Wood Cemetery in Brooklyn.

== See also ==
- Mathew Brady
- Alfred Cheney Johnston

== Gallery ==
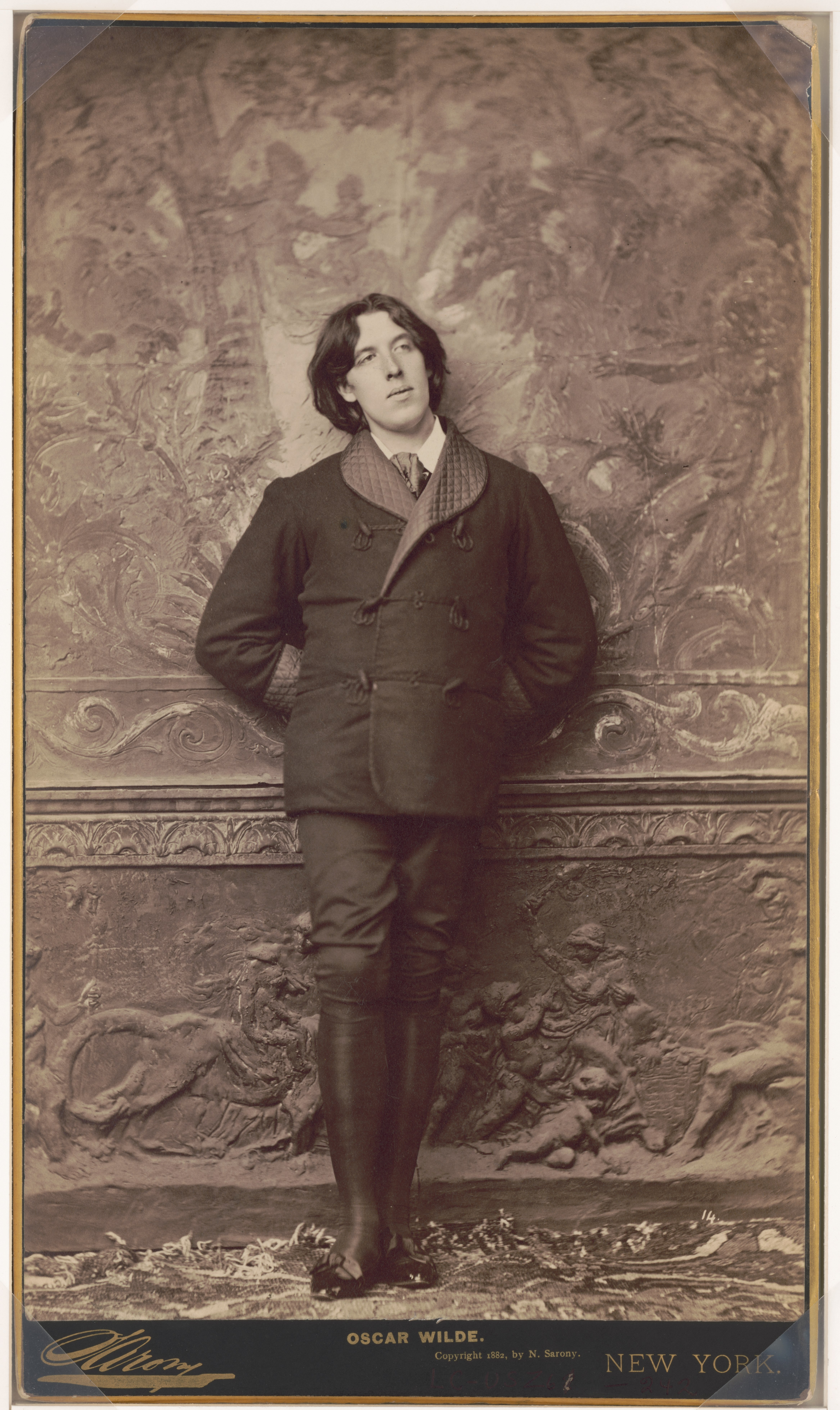
Oscar Wilde

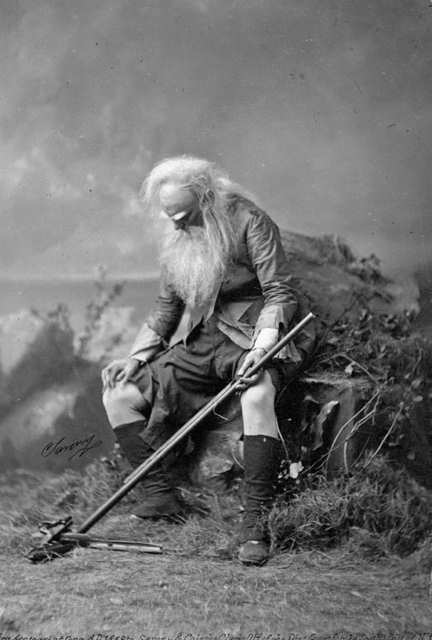
Joseph Jefferson as Rip Van Winkle, 1869

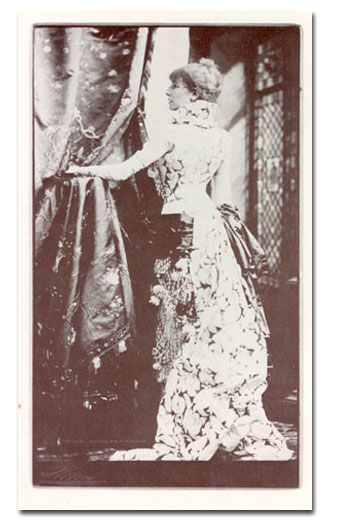
Actress Sarah Bernhardt

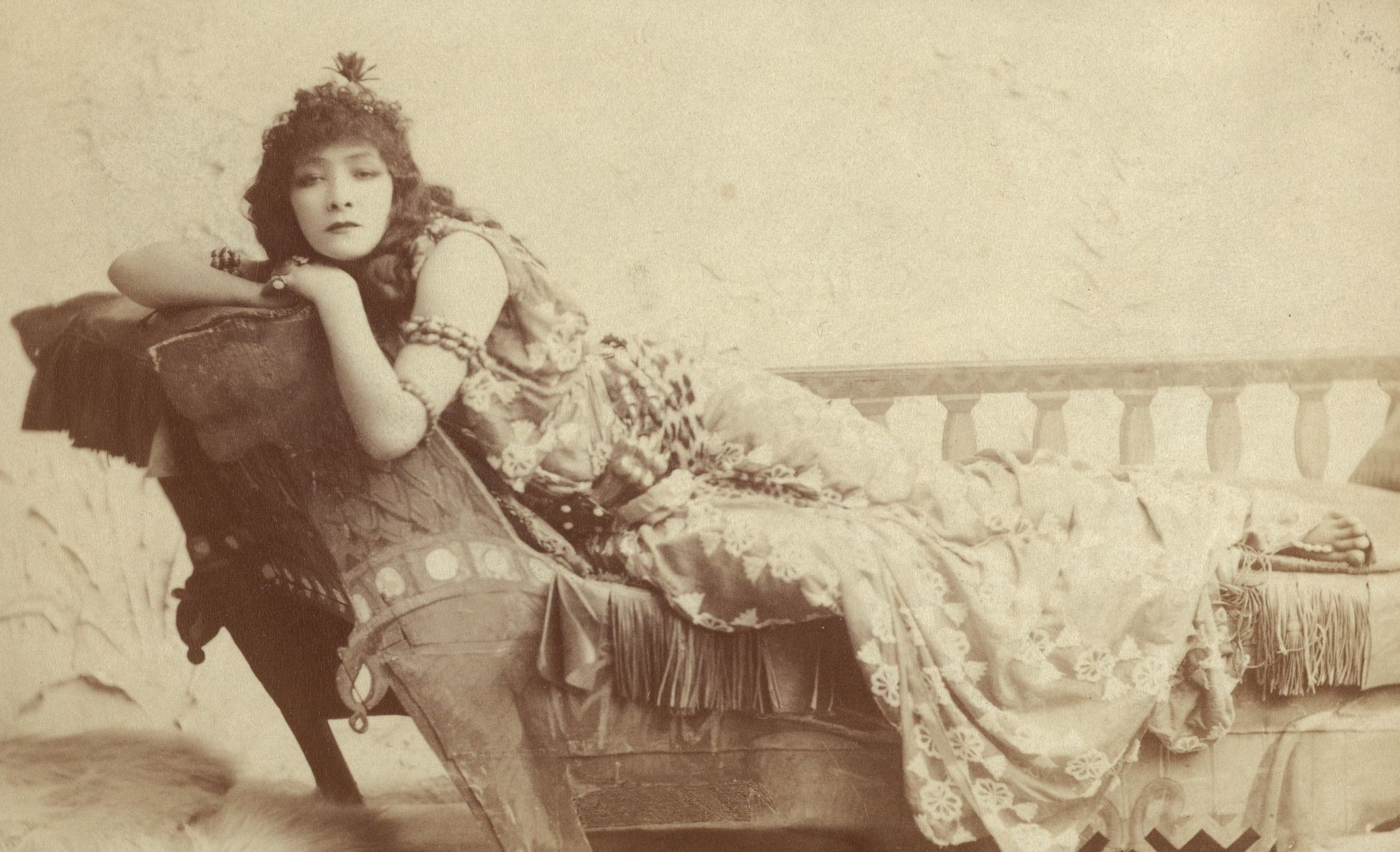
Sarah Bernhardt as Cleopatra, 1891

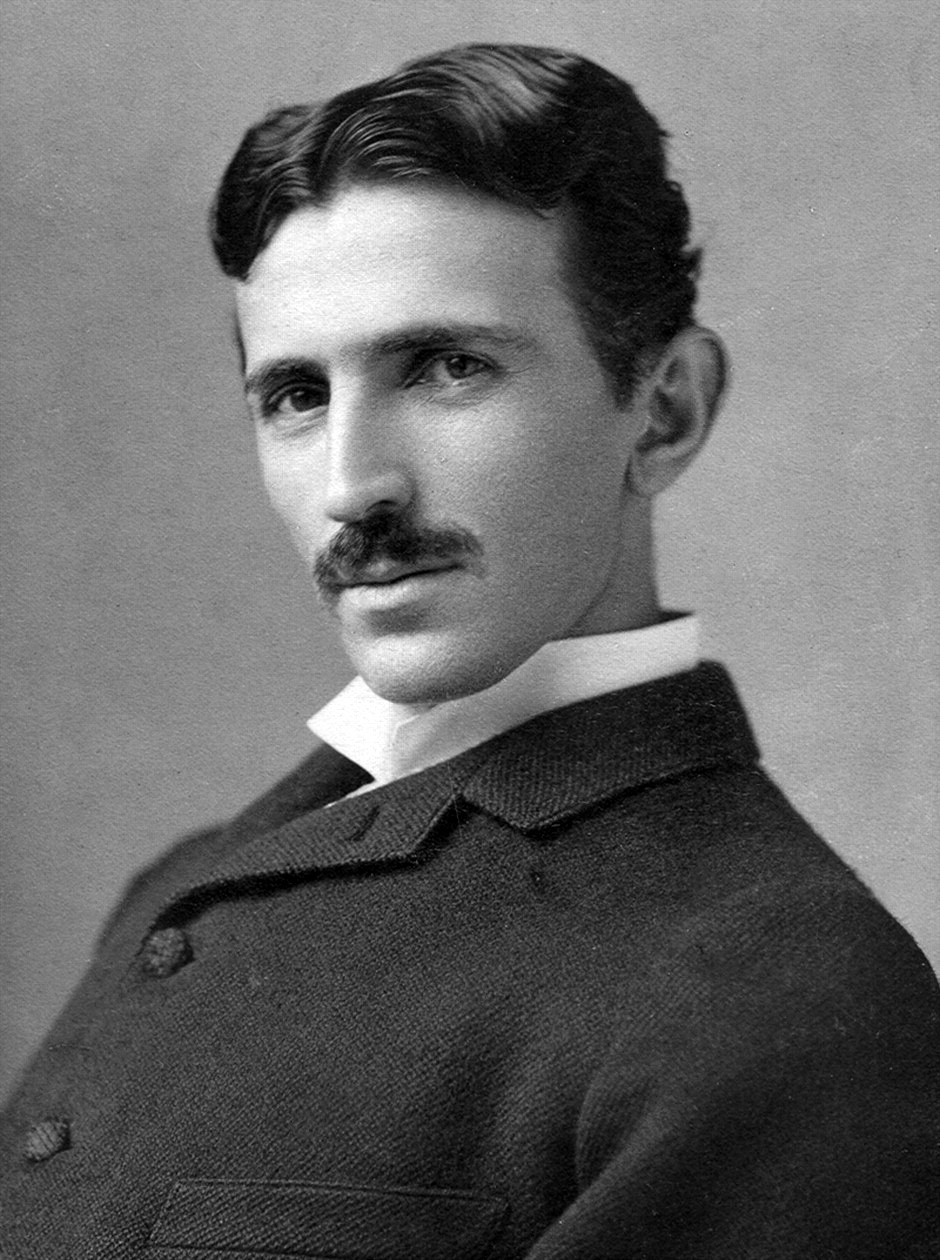
Nikola Tesla

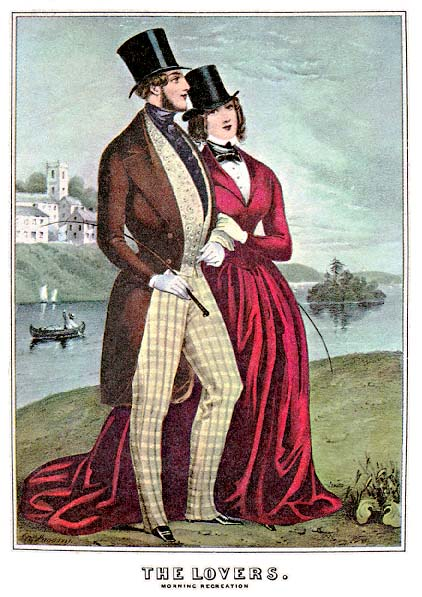
1850 print by Sarony and Major

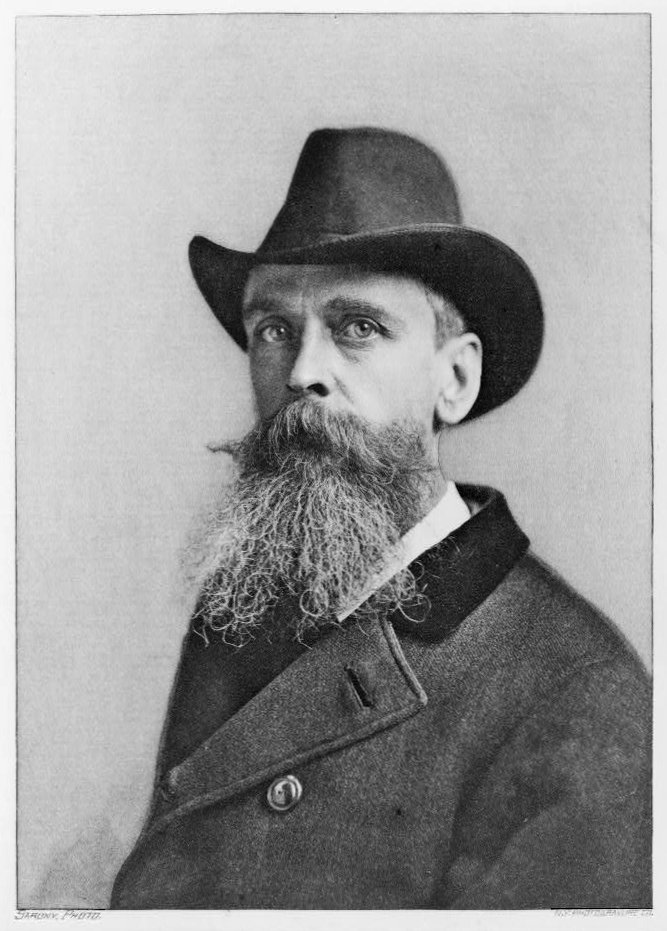
Artist Thomas Moran, c. 1890–1896

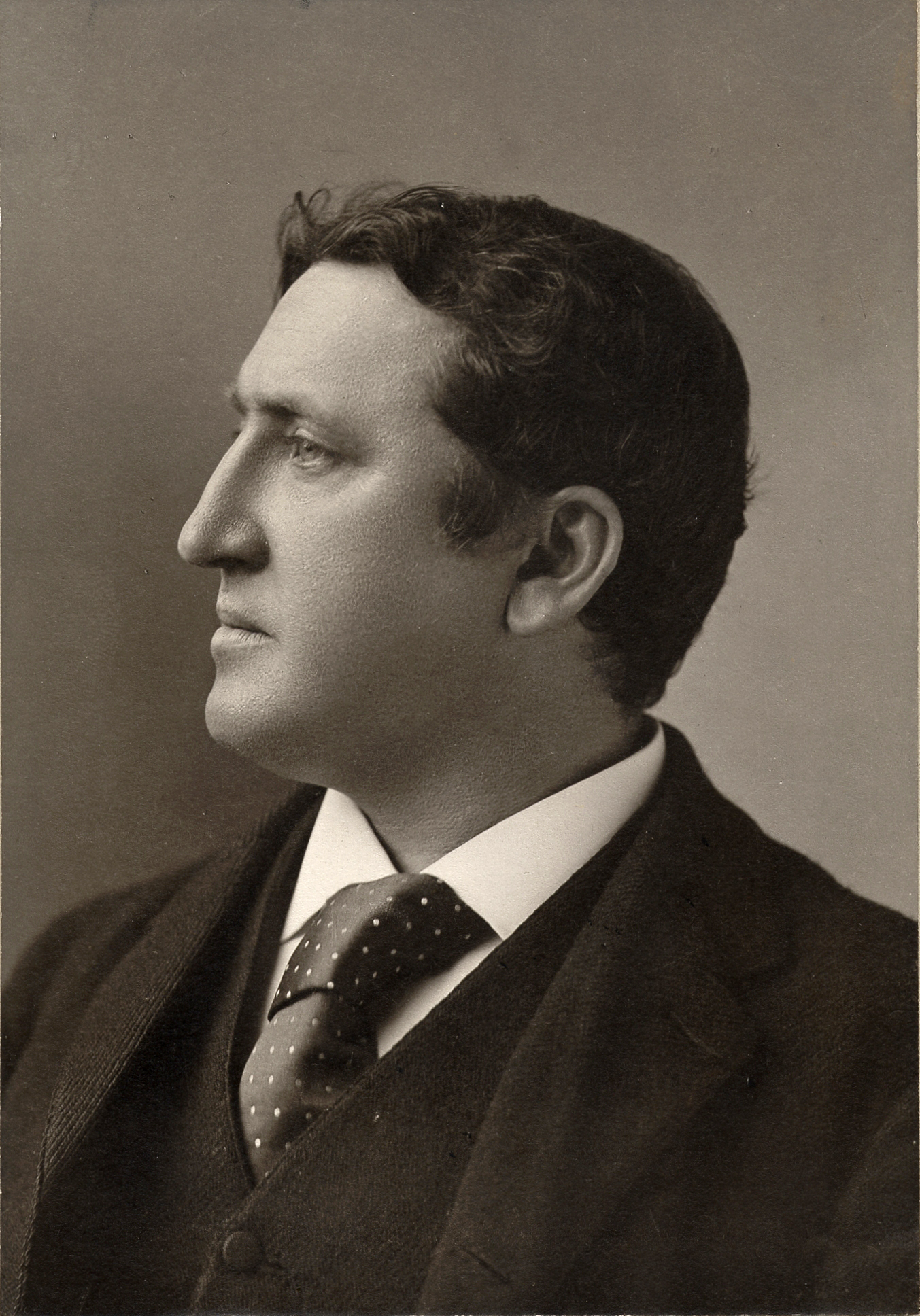
photo of James Huneker c. 1890

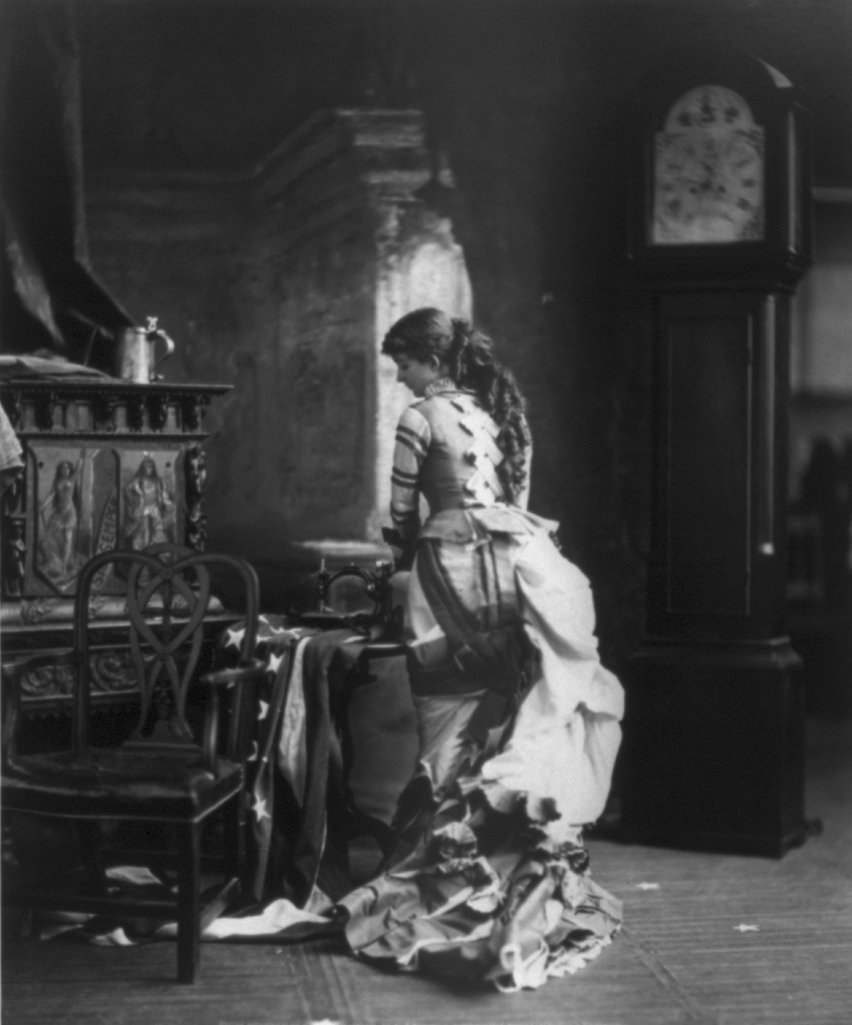
"Sarony's Centennial Tableaux", showing young woman making U.S. Flag on sewing machine, c. 1876

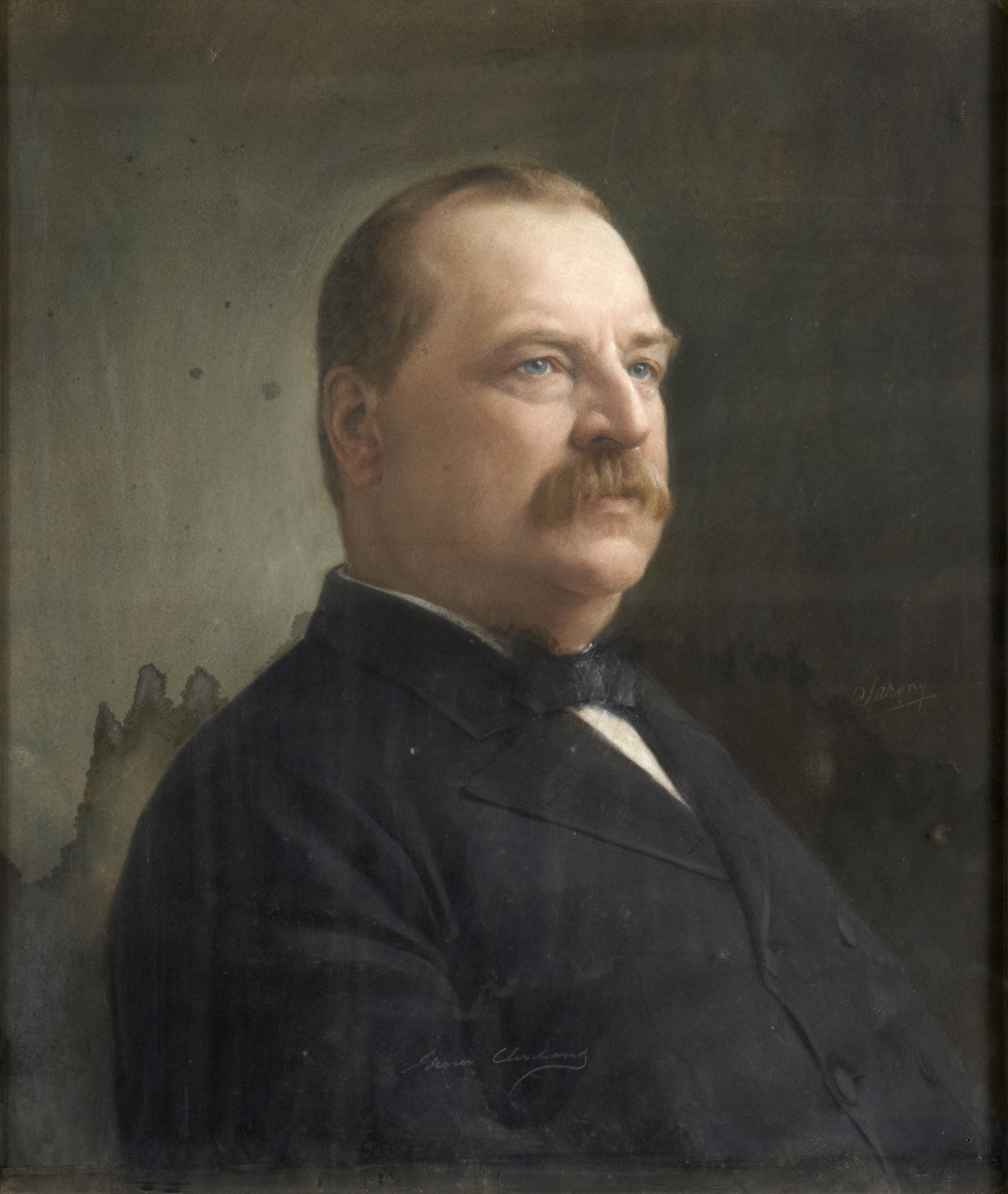
Grover Cleveland, 1882, Princeton University Art Museum

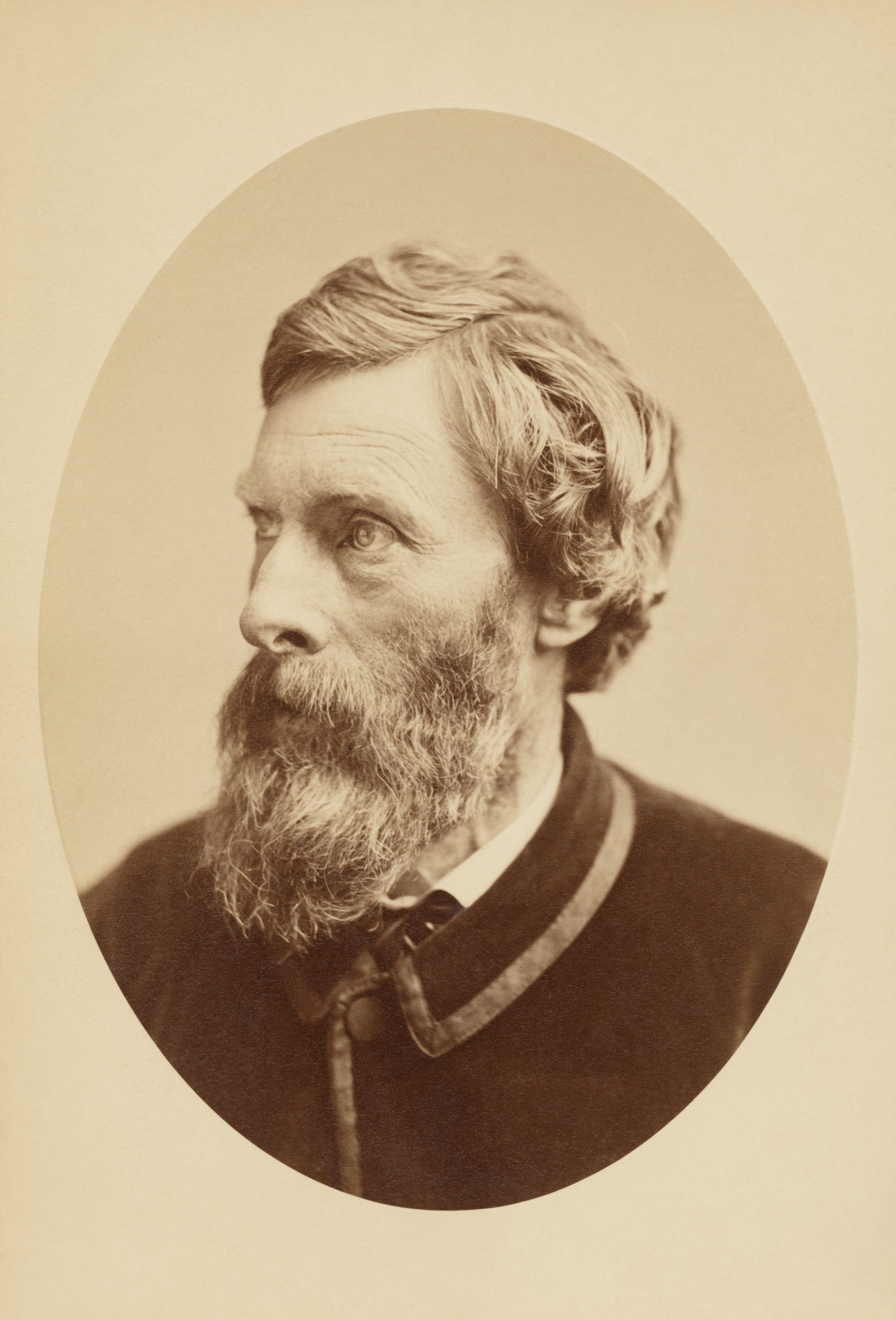
Jasper Francis Cropsey, c. 1870

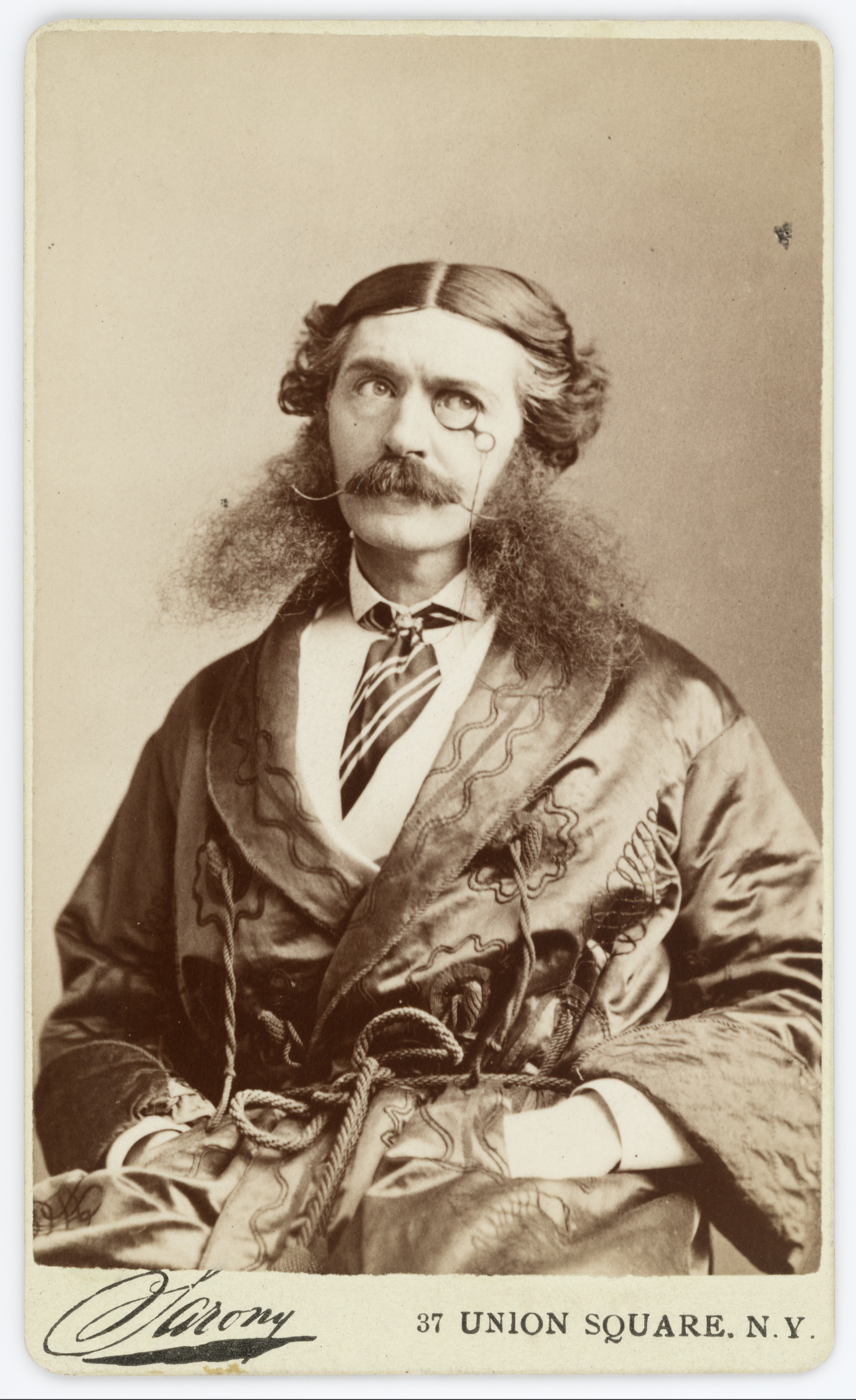
Edward Askew Sothern as Lord Dundreary, a character in the play Our American Cousin, c. 1872
