= Burrow-Giles Lithographic Co. v. Sarony =

- Supreme Court of the United States

Submitted December 13, 1883 Decided March 17, 1884
- Full case name: Burrow-Giles Lithographic Company v. Napoleon Sarony
- Citations: 111 U.S. 53 (more) 4 S. Ct. 279; 28 L. Ed. 349; 1884 U.S. LEXIS 1757

Case history
- Prior: Judgment for plaintiff, 17 F. 591 (S.D.N.Y. 1883); affirmed, C.C.S.D.N.Y.

Holding
- It is within the constitutional power of Congress to extend copyright protection to photographs that are a representation of an author's original intellectual conceptions. Circuit Court for the Southern District of New York affirmed.

Court membership
- Chief Justice Morrison Waite Associate Justices Samuel F. Miller · Stephen J. Field; Joseph P. Bradley · John M. Harlan; William B. Woods · Stanley Matthews; Horace Gray · Samuel Blatchford

Case opinion
- Majority: Miller, joined by unanimous

Laws applied
- U.S. Const. art. I; U.S. Rev. Stat. §§ 4952, 4965 (Copyright Act of 1870)

Burrow-Giles Lithographic Co. v. Sarony, 111 U.S. 53 (1884), was a case decided by the Supreme Court of the United States that upheld the power of Congress to extend copyright protection to photography.

== Background of the case ==
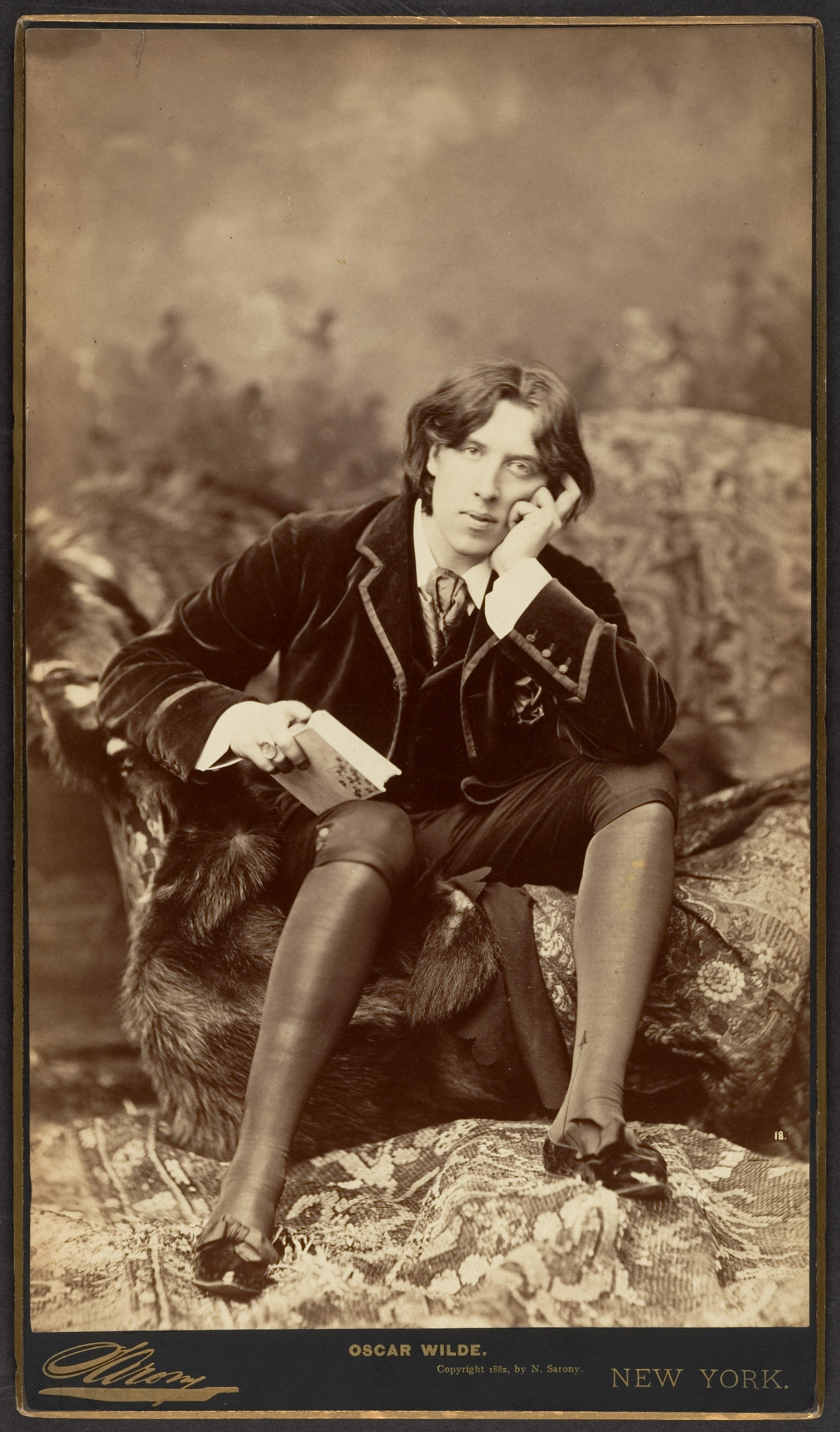
The subject of the lawsuit: Oscar Wilde No. 18 by Napoleon Sarony (1882)

Photographer Napoleon Sarony filed a copyright infringement suit against the Burrow-Giles Lithographic Company, which had marketed unauthorized lithographs of Sarony's photograph of writer Oscar Wilde, entitled "Oscar Wilde No. 18." The company argued that photographs could not qualify as "writings" or as the production of an "author", in the language of the grant of power to Congress under article I, section 8, clause 8 of the United States Constitution to protect copyrights, and so § 4952 of the Copyright Act of 1865, which explicitly extended protection to photographs, was unconstitutional. The federal trial court for the Southern District of New York, though expressing some doubt over the constitutionality of § 4952, declined to invalidate it and awarded a $610 judgment ($22,000 in modern dollars) to Sarony. It was affirmed by the U.S. Circuit Court for the Southern District of New York, and then appealed to the Supreme Court.

== The Supreme Court's decision ==
Regarding the interpretation of "writings" in the Constitution, Justice Miller's unanimous opinion for the Supreme Court wrote that Congress has "properly declared these to include all forms of writing, printing, engraving, etching, &c., by which the ideas in the mind of the author are given visible expression." The Court noted that "maps and charts" were among the subjects of the first Copyright Act of 1790, and that etchings and engravings were added when it was first amended in 1802. The members of Congress that passed these first copyright acts were contemporaries of the Framers of the Constitution, and many of them attended the Constitutional Convention itself. As such, their interpretation of the Constitution, Justice Miller wrote, "is of itself entitled to very great weight, and when it is remembered that the rights thus established have not been disputed during a period of nearly a century, it is almost conclusive."

Even if other visual works could be copyrighted, Burrow-Giles argued, photography was merely a mechanical process rather than an art, and could not embody an author's "idea". The Court accepted that this may be true of "ordinary" photographs, but this was not in the case of Sarony's image of Wilde. The trial court had found that Sarony had "by posing the said Oscar Wilde in front of the camera, selecting and arranging the costume, draperies, and other various accessories in said photograph, arranging the subject so as to present graceful outlines, arranging and disposing the light and shade, suggesting and evoking the desired expression, and from such disposition, arrangement, or representation, made entirely by the plaintiff, he produced the picture in suit." This control that Sarony exercised over the subject matter, in the view of the Court, showed that he was the "author" of "an original work of art" and thus within the "class" of things for which the Constitution intended Congress to grant him exclusive rights under the copyright laws.

== See also ==
- List of United States Supreme Court copyright case law
- List of United States Supreme Court cases by the Waite Court
