= Gwen Le Gallienne =

English painter

- Born: Gwendolyn Hinton Perry; 1897; France
- Died: 1990; Kensington, London, England
- Occupation: Artist, painter, sculptor
- Relatives: Richard Le Gallienne (step-father); Eva Le Gallienne (step-sister)

Gwen Le Gallienne (born Gwendolyn Hinton Perry; 5 November 1898 – 21 November 1990) was a French-born, American-raised, England-based painter and sculptor. She was the first woman allowed to sketch battlefield scenes by the British War Office.

== Life ==
Gwendolyn was born to Irma Perry (née Hinton) and Roland Hinton Perry in 1897. Her parents were first cousins. She was Richard Le Gallienne's step-daughter, and took the name Gwen Le Gallienne. Her mother Irma was Richard Le Gallienne's third wife, and Irma and Richard married in 1911. Her mother's sister was artist Clio Hinton Bracken. Gwen was considered somewhat of a celebrity, starting in the 1920s, due to her nonconformity to sexual and social norms which led her to stand out. Her personality was even notable among the Montparnasse bohemian circle. Gwen was noted for having an affair with Louise Bryant. Gwen was friends with Stephen Ward during this time. Gwen and Bryant started their affair early in 1928, which caused much strain in Bryant's marriage. Allegedly, Bryant's husband (former U.S. diplomatic envoy to Soviet Russia, William C. Bullitt) found Louise's personal notes about her affair with Gwen and this caused their divorce. Gwen was also involved with artist Yvette Ledoux, daughter of Urbain Ledoux ("Mr. Zero"), but Ledoux became involved with (and later married) the Surrealist painter Georges Malkine on a trip they all took in January 1929. They remained married until her death.

== Career ==
Gwen was exhibiting her art by her twenties. She had multiple solo shows of her work. In 1940, Le Gallienne was the first female painter who was allowed by the United Kingdom's War Office to go to war sites and paint scenes of battles. Gwen also served in British intelligence during the war.

== Links ==
- A photograph of Gwen Le Gallienne by Berenice Abbott
- Another photograph of Gwen Le Gallienne by Berenice Abbott
