= Otto Sarony =

American photographer (1850–1903)

- Born: 1850; Canada
- Died: September 14, 1903 (aged 52–53); New York City, US
- Occupation: Photographer

Otto Sarony (1850–1903) was a Canadian-born American portrait photographer and the owner of a celebrity photography business. His father was Napoleon Sarony, the premier theatrical photographer of the 19th century. Sarony the Younger, as he was known, continued the family business.

His photography business put out photos of Evelyn Nesbit, Clara Blandick, Richard Bennett, Elsie Leslie and other stars of stage and screen as well as other celebrities such as boxer Jack Johnson under his name. The actual photographers were uncredited (as he was when he worked for his father).

He died from phthisis on September 14, 1903. Funeral services were held at the Stephen Merritt Chapel, in New York City.

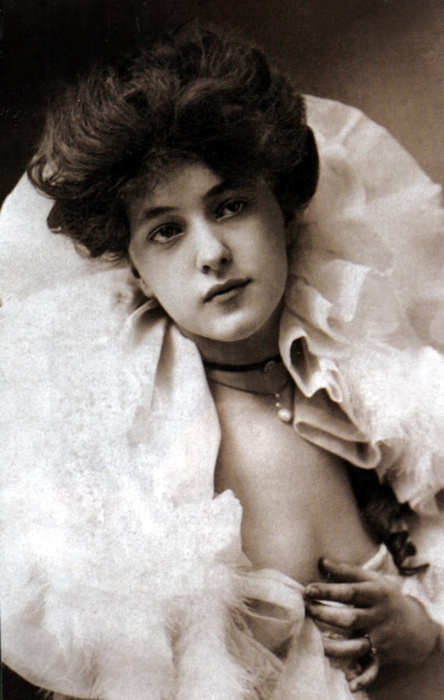
Evelyn Nesbit

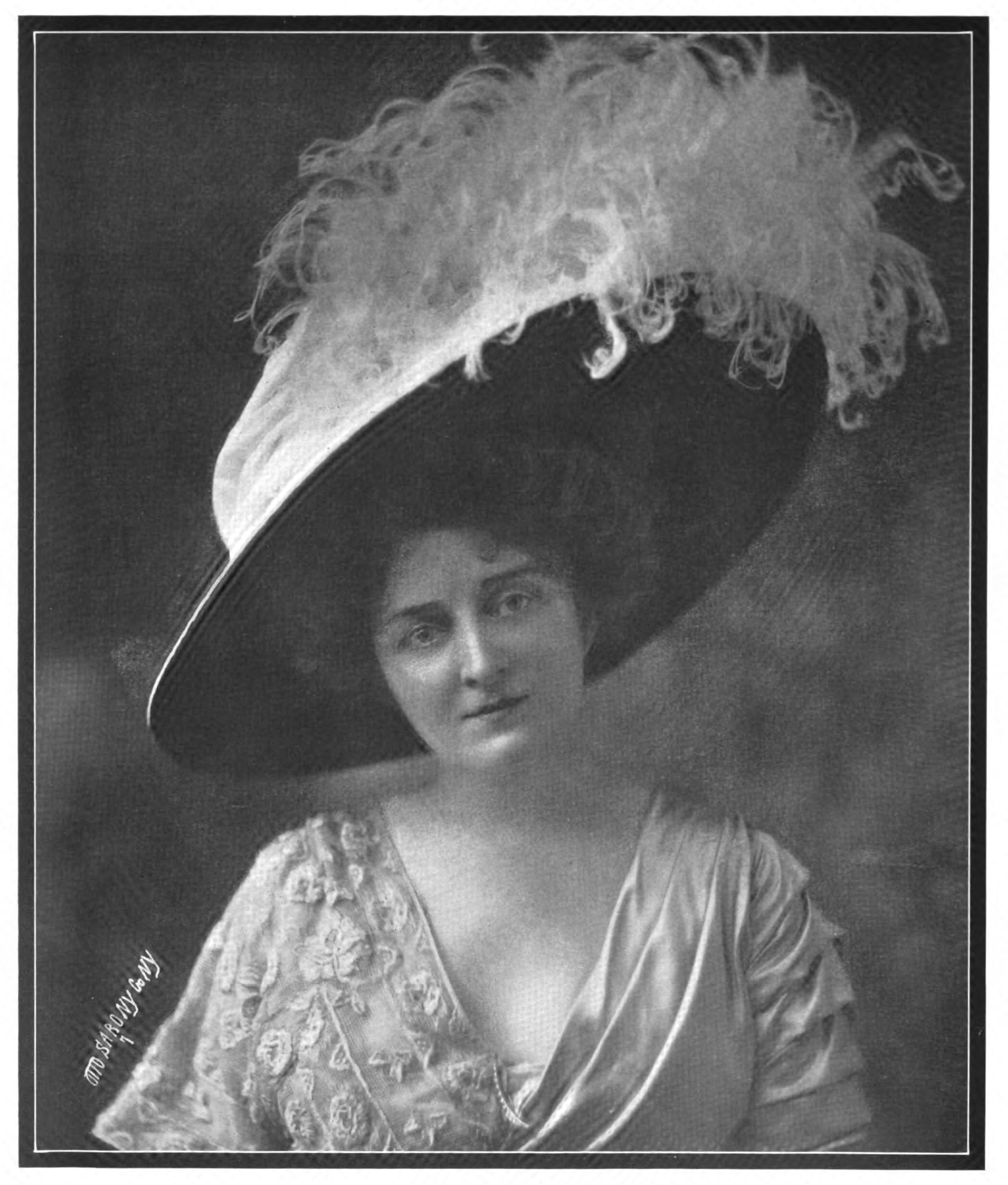
Broadway actress Alice Johnson in 1908

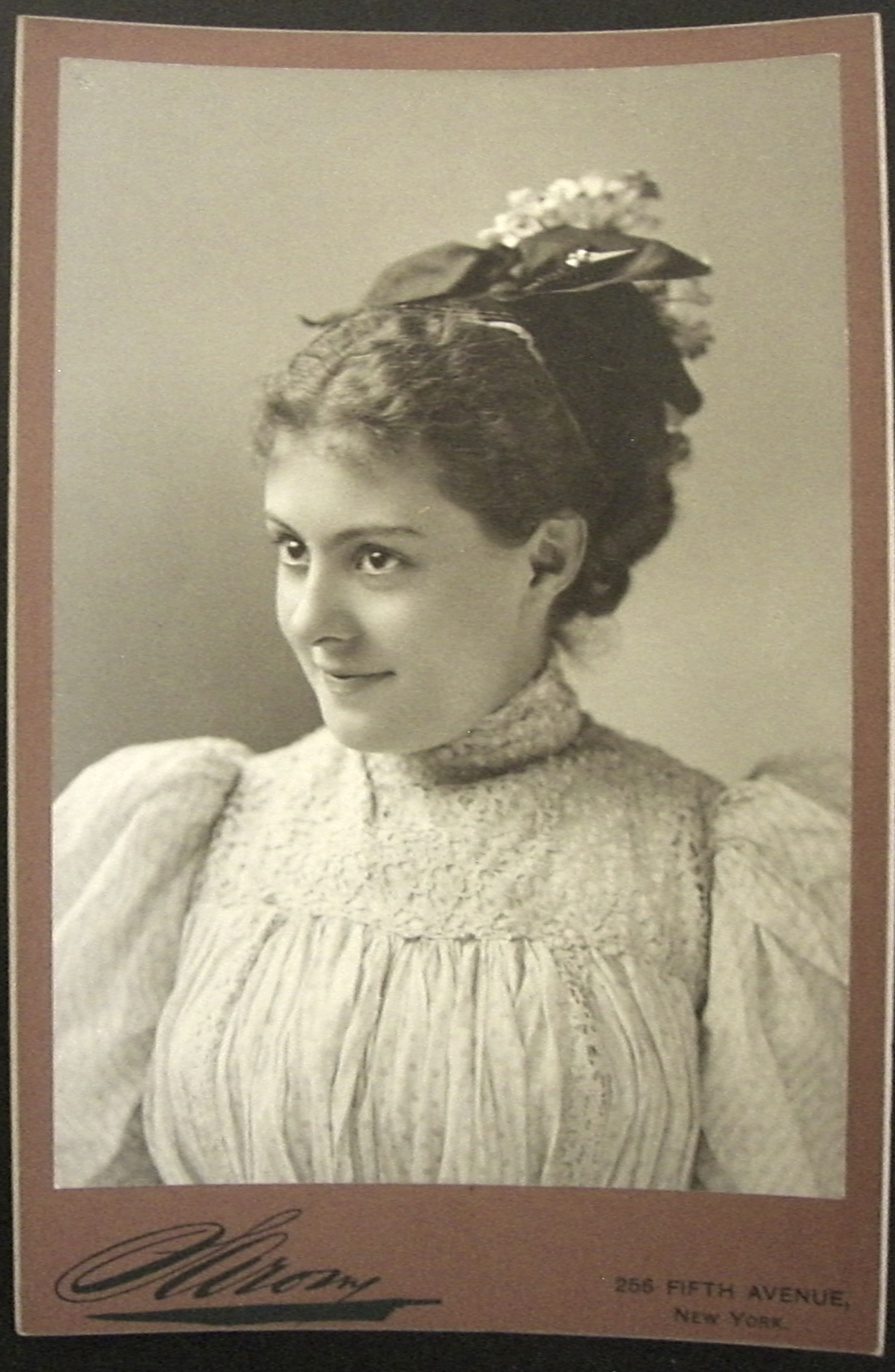
Cissy Fitzgerald

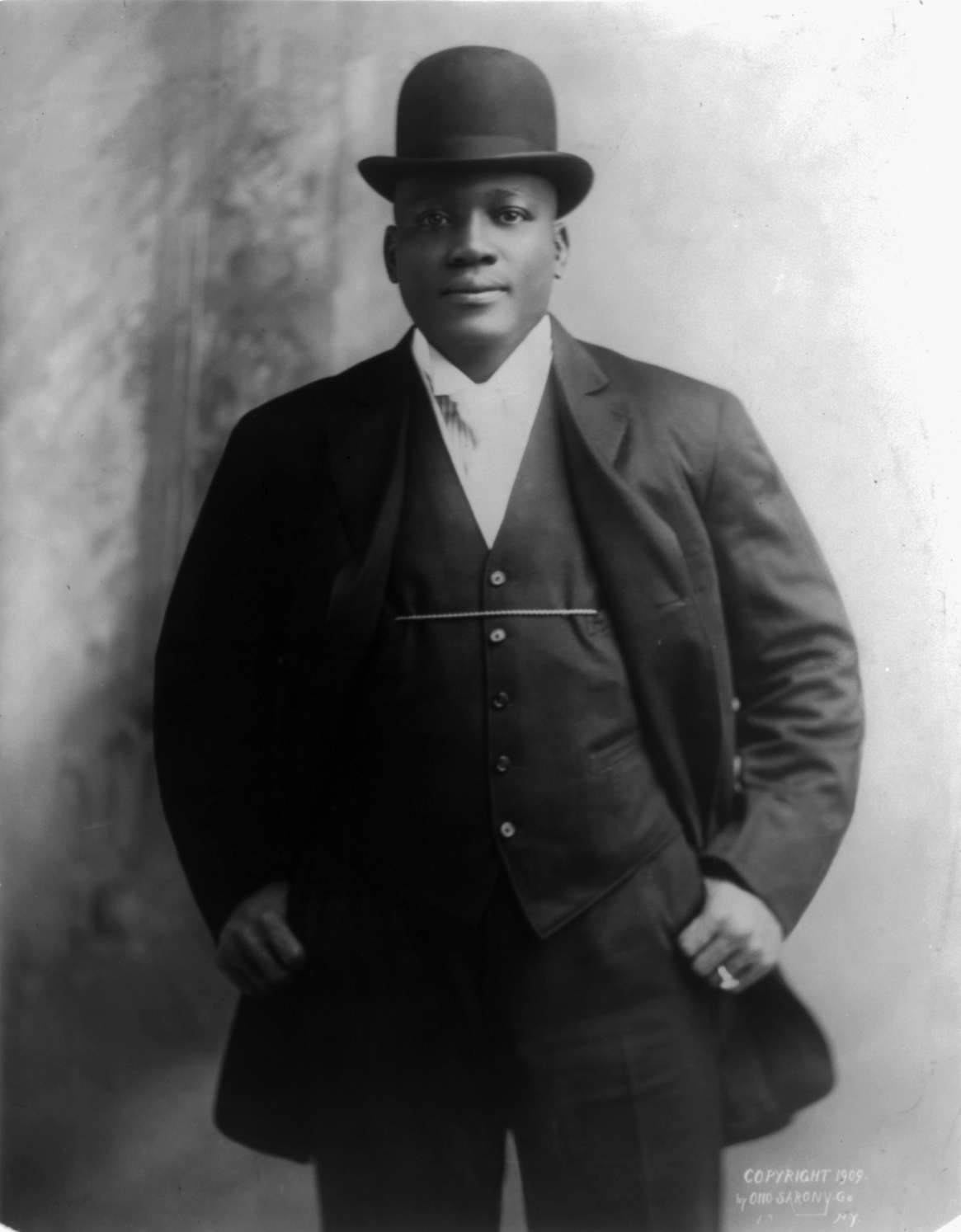
Boxer Jack Johnson

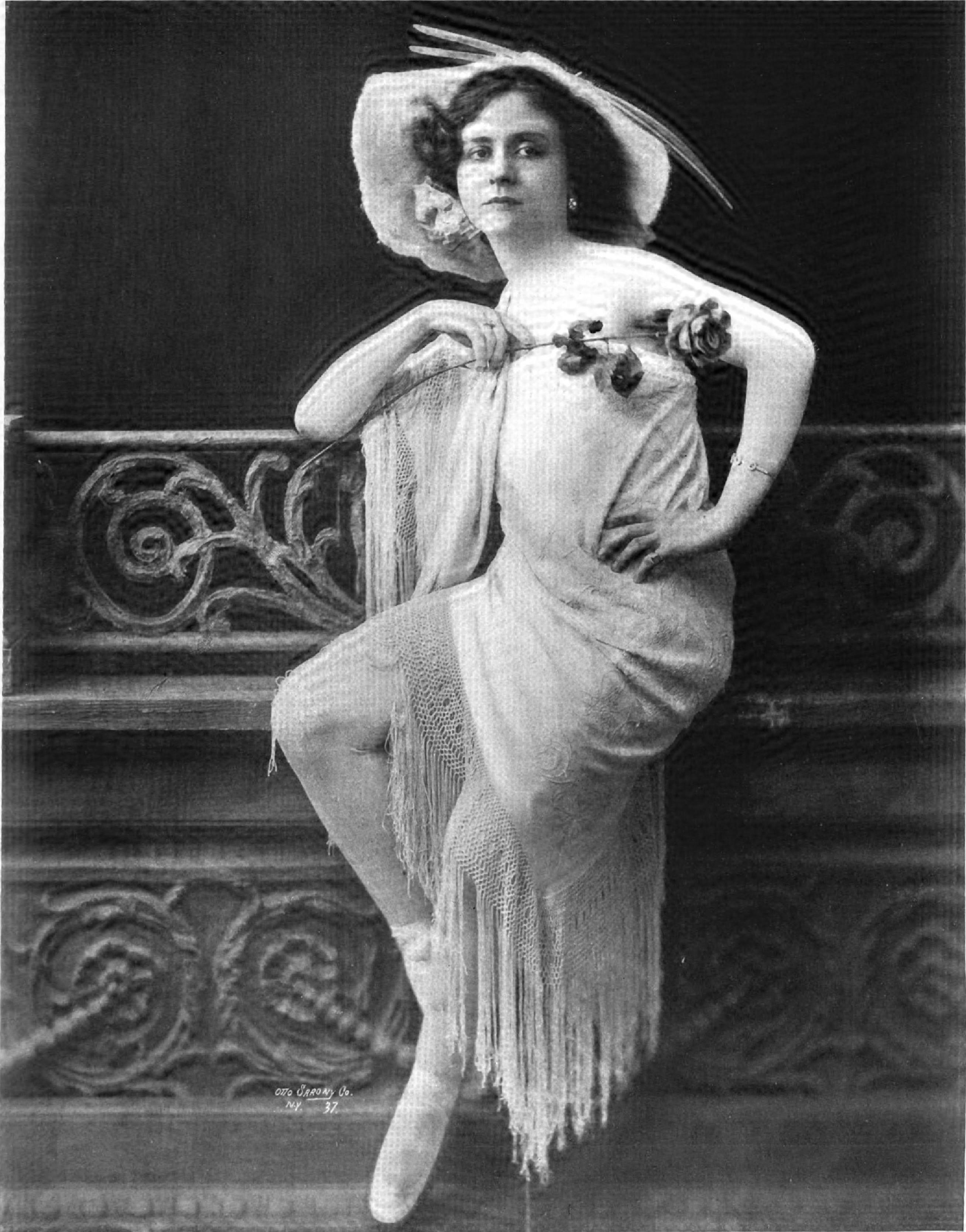
Mlle. Dazie

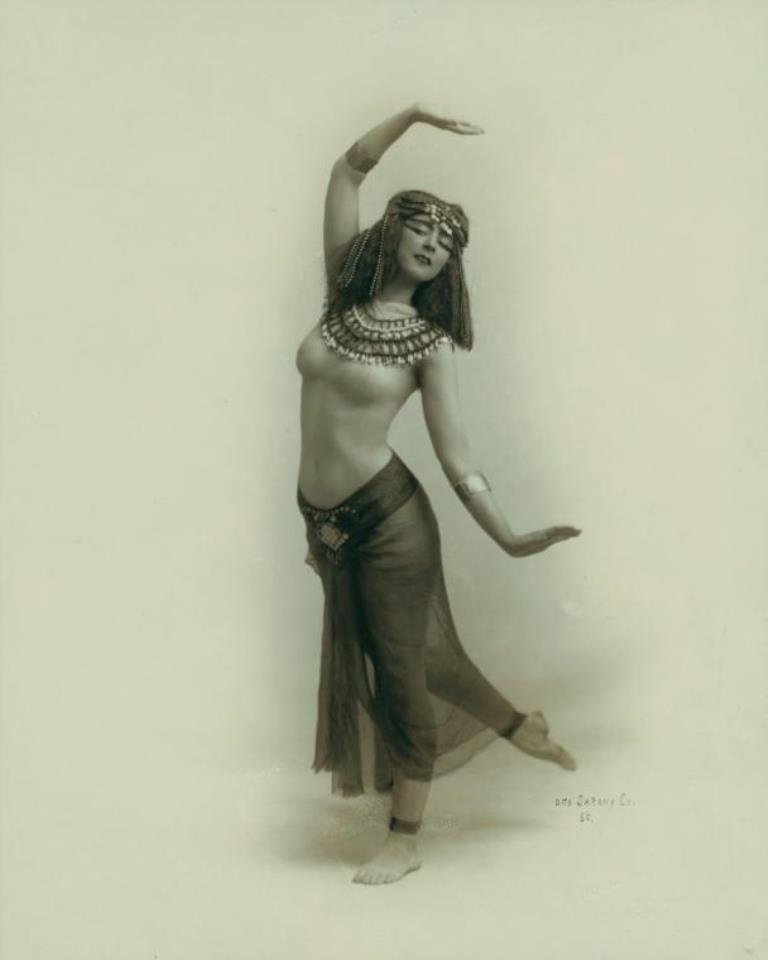
Ruth St. Denis (1910)
