= Richard Le Gallienne =

British writer

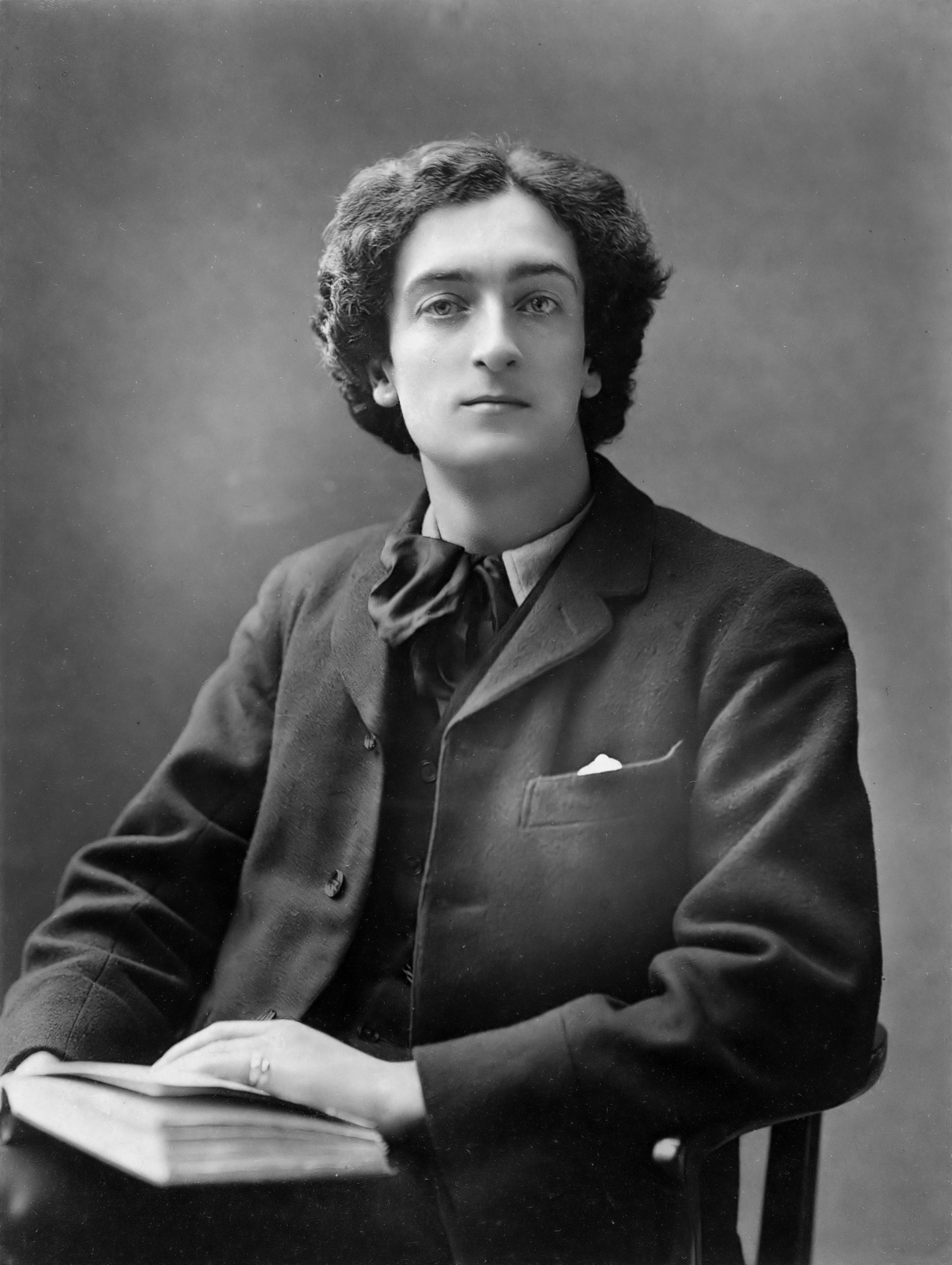
- before 1901
- Born: Richard Thomas Gallienne; 20 January 1866; Liverpool, England, United Kingdom of Great Britain and Ireland
- Died: 15 September 1947 (aged 81); Menton, French Fourth Republic
- Burial place: Menton, France
- Occupations: Poet, author
- Years active: 1886–1947
- Known for: The Yellow Book (1894–1897); The Quest of the Golden Girl (1896)
- Movement: Romantic Poetry
- Spouses: Mildred Lee (m. 1886; died 1894) Julie Nørregaard (m. 1897; div. 1911) Irma Hinton (m. 1911)
- Partner: Oscar Wilde
- Relatives: Hesper Joyce Hutchinson (née Le Gallienne) (daughter); Eva Le Gallienne (daughter); Gwen Le Gallienne (step-daughter)

Richard Le Gallienne (20 January 1866 – 15 September 1947) was an English author and poet. The British-American actress Eva Le Gallienne (1899–1991) was his daughter by his second marriage to Danish journalist Julie Nørregaard (1863–1942).

== Life and career ==
Richard Thomas Gallienne was born at West Derby, Liverpool, England, eldest son of Jean ("John") Gallienne (1843-1929), manager of the Birkenhead Brewery, and his wife Jane (1839-1910), née Smith. He attended the (then) all boys public school Liverpool College. After leaving school he changed his name to Le Gallienne and started work in an accountant's office in London. In 1883, his father took him to a lecture by Oscar Wilde in Birkenhead. He soon abandoned this job to become a professional writer with ambitions of being a poet. His book My Ladies' Sonnets appeared in 1887, and in 1889 he became, for a brief time, literary secretary to Wilson Barrett. In the summer of 1888 he met Wilde, and the two had a brief affair. Le Gallienne and Wilde continued an intimate correspondence after the end of the affair. Directly following this affair, Gallienne stayed with Joseph Gleeson White and his wife in Christchurch, Hampshire.

He joined the staff of the newspaper The Star in 1891 and wrote for various papers under the name Logroller. He contributed to The Yellow Book, and associated with the Rhymers' Club.

His first wife, Mildred Lee, and their second daughter, Maria, died in 1894 during childbirth, leaving behind Richard and their daughter Hesper Joyce. After Mildred's death he carried with him at all times, including while married to his second wife, an urn containing Mildred's ashes. Rupert Brooke, who met Le Gallienne in 1913 aboard a ship bound for the United States but did not warm to him, wrote a short poem "For Mildred's Urn" satirising this behaviour.

Lithographed portrait of Le Gallienne by Philip Wilson Steer (1894)

In 1897 he married the Danish journalist Julie Nørregaard. She became stepmother to Hesper, and their daughter Eva was born 11 January 1899. In 1901 and 1902, he was a writer for The Rambler, a magazine produced by Herbert Vivian intended to be a revival of Samuel Johnson's periodical of the same name.

In 1903 Nørregaard left Richard, taking both of his daughters to live in Paris. Nørregaard later sent Hesper to live with her paternal grandparents in an affluent part of London while Eva remained with her mother. Julie later cited his inability to provide a stable home or pay his debts, alcoholism, and womanising as grounds for divorce. Their daughter Eva would grow up to take on some of her father's negative traits, including womanising and heavy drinking.

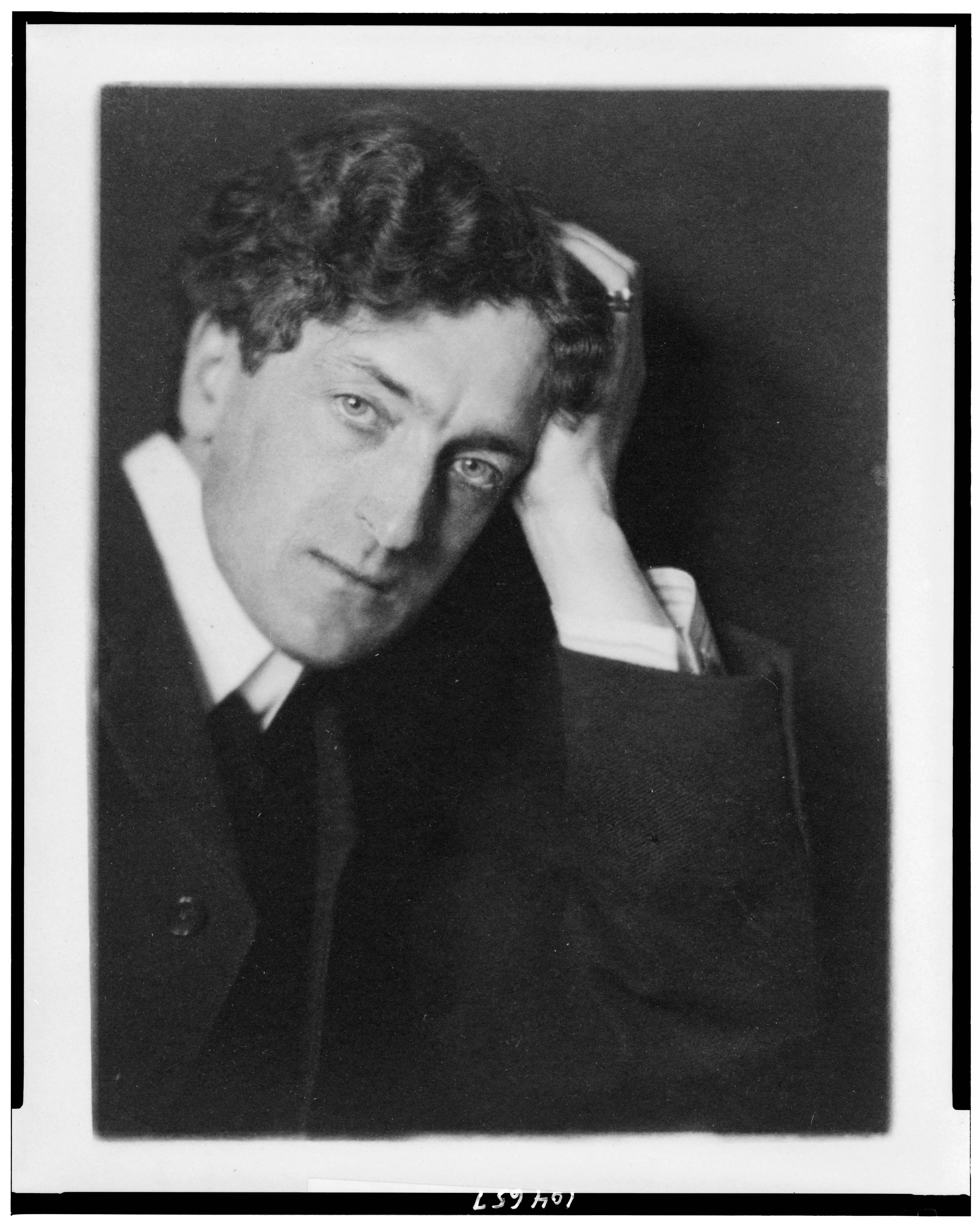
1903

Le Gallienne subsequently became a resident of the United States. He has been credited with the 1906 translation from the Danish of Peter Nansen's Love's Trilogy, but most sources and the book itself attribute it to Nørregaard. They were divorced in June 1911. On 27 October 1911, he married Mrs. Irma Perry (née Hinton), whose previous marriage to her first cousin, the painter and sculptor Roland Hinton Perry, had been dissolved in 1904. Le Gallienne and Irma had known each other for some time and had jointly published an article as early as 1906. Irma's daughter Gwendolyn Hinton Perry subsequently called herself Gwen Le Gallienne but was almost certainly not his natural daughter, having been born circa 1898.

From the late 1920s, Le Gallienne and Perry lived in Paris, where Gwen Le Gallienne was by then an established figure in the expatriate bohème and where Le Gallienne wrote a regular newspaper column.

Le Gallienne lived in Menton on the French Riviera during the 1940s. During the Second World War he was prevented from returning to his Menton home and lived in Monaco for the rest of the war. His house in Menton was occupied by German troops and his library was nearly sent back to Germany as bounty. Le Gallienne appealed to a German officer in Monaco, who allowed him to return to Menton to collect his books. During the war Le Gallienne refused to write propaganda for the local German and Italian authorities and, unable to buy food without an income, he once collapsed in the street from hunger.

In later times he knew Llewelyn Powys and John Cowper Powys.

Asked how to say his name, he told The Literary Digest the stress was "on the last syllable: le gal-i-enn'. As a rule I hear it pronounced as if it were spelled 'gallion,' which, of course, is wrong." (Charles Earle Funk, What's the Name, Please?, Funk & Wagnalls, 1936.)

A number of his works are now available online.

He also wrote the foreword to The Days I Knew by Lillie Langtry 1925, George H. Doran Company on Murray Hill New York.

Le Gallienne is buried in Menton in a grave whose lease (license No. 738 / B Extension of the Trabuquet Cemetery) expired in 2023.

== Exhibitions ==
In 2016 an exhibition on the life and works of Richard Le Gallienne was held at the central library in his home city of Liverpool, England. Entitled "Richard Le Gallienne: Liverpool's Wild(e) Poet", it featured his affair with Oscar Wilde, his famous actress daughter Eva Le Gallienne and his personal ties to the city. The exhibition ran for six weeks between August and October 2016, and a talk about him was held at the Victorian Literary Symposium during Liverpool's Literary festival the same year.

== Themes ==
=== Decadence ===
Richard Le Gallienne’s work focused on themes of beauty and indulgence, highly inspired and connected to the Decadent movement. To Le Gallienne, Decadence was a powerful literary movement having said that “what one calls decadence another would call renaissance”. Many of Le Gallienne’s work focused on the perspective of beauty such as with early works such as English Poems and continued through his career such as in The Lonely Dancer and Other Poems. Le Gallienne's literary work also exemplifies the Decadent movement through its exploration of themes such as spiritual disillusionment and aestheticism. As a late-Victorian poet, his writings are evocative of innovative ideas such as nature and strange beauty, comparable to the works of William Butler Yeats. Despite his connections to the movement, Le Gallienne's work often exhibits a Romantic sensibility, often using similes to emphasize individual emotion and spiritual yearning over the stylized aesthetics characteristic of Decadence. This blend of Decadent themes with Romantic ideals underscores the complexity of his literary identity and his nuanced engagement with the cultural currents of his time.

=== The Quest Of The Golden Girl ===
The novel "The Quest of the Golden Girl" by Richard Le Gallienne, is a narrative that follows a first-person perspective of a man around thirty who decides to embark on a journey after his sister gets married, initially seeking an ideal "Golden Girl." He encounters various individuals and experiences, and has discussions on love, marriage, social customs, and personal philosophy. The narrator recalls his affectionate encounters with approximately seven different women, and elaborates upon each of his unique experiences, including a relationship with a dancer named Sylvia Joy. Eventually, the narrator finds a woman named Elizabeth who claims to be the ‘Golden Girl’, who he encounters under difficult circumstances.

In the novel, the protagonist’s interactions with others prompt ongoing self-reflection. His pursuit of love aligns with themes associated with Decadence, including intense self-consciousness and a focus on personal desire. One definition of Decadence describes it as “an intense self-consciousness, a restless curiosity in research, an over-subtilizing refinement upon refinement, and a spiritual and moral perversity.” Throughout the narrative, the protagonist encounters multiple lovers and engages in self-exploration, reflecting on his desires and emotional development. These experiences contribute to his understanding of love, both toward others and himself. Such themes reflect broader cultural currents of the Victorian period, during which many artists, poets, and writers explored identity and self-expression amid emerging artistic and intellectual movements.

This piece, utilizing a form of yellow coloring in the color gold, is closely affiliated to the decadent style of the Victorian age. Being in close proximity to Oscar Wilde, it isn’t uncommon for Richard Le Gallienne to partake in topics dealing with enthusiasm for beauty. Le Gallienne, within a long literary history of works regarding beauty, he upheld aesthetic values, favoring impressionistic appreciation over rigid analysis. Though once critiqued for sentimentality, Le Gallienne ultimately earned recognition as a major poet and devoted celebrant of beauty, as shown by the narrator within “The Quest of the Golden Girl”, as he expresses his appreciation for the different women he meets.

== Influence ==
Richard Le Gallienne was a prolific author of the Aesthetic literary movement, contributing numerous works exemplifying the themes of sensationalism throughout his career. His poetry was heavily influenced by Romantic, Pre-Raphaelite, and Victorian aspects that formed the complex literary scene of England at the end of the 19th century. Le Gallienne was dedicated to epitomizing beauty with reverence and sensuous flair in his pieces, which often drew harsh judgement from critics for its extravagant sentimentalism. Though a staunch poetic traditionalist and dissenter of Decadent ideas, Le Gallienne’s primary emphasis on sensation perfectly embodied the spirit of the movement and delineated him from other contemporaries of the Victorian fin de siècle. Le Gallienne’s dedication to Aestheticism put him at odds with the emerging Modernist movement at the turn of the century. He was a vocal opponent of Modernist sentiments, using his poetry publications to denounce the lack of appreciation for Beauty and idealism he felt constituted the style. In a letter to New York Times Book Review editor James Donald Adams, Le Gallienne reviles modernity as “abhorrent” and likens its idolization of vulgarity to the “reveling [of] filthy little boys, in shouting out as many dirty words as possible for their own sake."

== Works ==
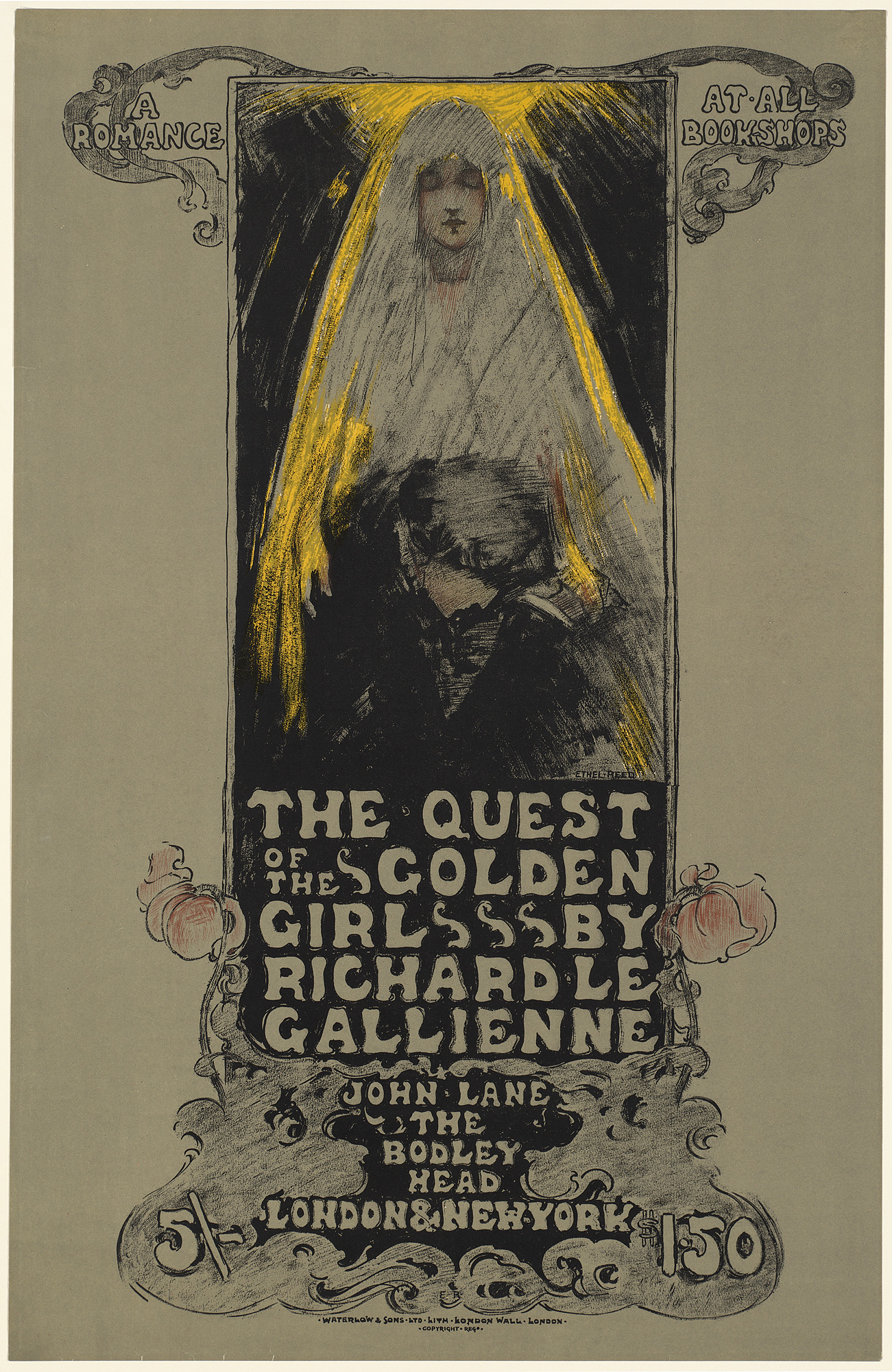
Poster for The Quest of the Golden Girl (1896)

- My Ladies' Sonnets and Other Vain and Amatorious Verses (1887)
- Volumes in Folio (1889) poems
- George Meredith: Some Characteristics (1890)
- The Student and the Body Snatcher and Other Trifles with Robinson K. Leather (1890)
- The Book-Bills of Narcissus (1891)
- English Poems (1892)
- The Religion of a Literary Man (1893)
- Liber Amoris or the New Pygmalion by William Hazlitt (1894) introduction
- Robert Louis Stevenson: An Elegy and Other Poems (1895)
- The Quest of the Golden Girl (1896) novel
- Prose Fancies (1896)
- Retrospective Reviews (1896)
- Rubaiyat of Omar Khayyam (1897) translation
- If I Were God (1897)
- The Romance of Zion Chapel (1898)
- In Praise of Bishop Valentine (1898)
- Young Lives (1899)
- Sleeping Beauty and Other Prose Fancies (1900)
- The Worshipper of the Image (1900)
- Travels in England (1900)
- The Love Letters of the King, or The Life Romantic (1901)
- An Old Country House (1902)
- Odes from the Divan of Hafiz (1903) translation
- Old Love Stories Retold (1904)
- Painted Shadows (1904)
- Romances of Old France (1905)
- Little Dinners with the Sphinx and other Prose Fancies (1907)
- Omar Repentant (1908)
- Wagner's Tristan and Isolde (1909) translation
- Orestes (1910) Verse Drama
- Attitudes and Avowals (1910) essays
- October Vagabonds (1910)
- New Poems (1910)
- The Loves of the Poets (1911)
- The Maker of Rainbows and Other Fairy-Tales and Fables (1912)
- The Lonely Dancer and Other Poems (1913)
- The Highway to Happiness (1913)
- Vanishing Roads and Other Essays (1915)
- The Silk-Hat Soldier and Other Poems in War Time (1915)
- The Chain Invisible (1916)
- Pieces of Eight (1918)
- The Junk-Man and Other Poems (1920)
- The Diary of Samuel Pepys (1921) editor
- A Jongleur Strayed (1922) poems
- Woodstock: An Essay (1923)
- The Romantic '90s (1925) memoirs
- The Romance of Perfume (1928)
- There Was a Ship (1930)
- From a Paris Garret (1936) memoirs
