= Gypsy Love =

Gypsy Love may refer to:

== Film and TV ==
- Gypsy Love (1914 film), American film with Margaret Risser
- Gypsy Love (1922 film), 1922 Austrian film

== Music ==
- Gypsy Love (operetta), 1910 operetta by Franz Lehár, Alfred Willner, and Robert Bodanzky
- "Gypsy Love", song by Jack Savoretti from his album Between the Minds
- "Gypsy Love" , 1996 album by folk rock artist Rick Droit' '
- "Amor Gitano", song by Alejandro Fernández and Beyoncé
- "Gypsy Love Song", ('Slumber on, my little gypsy sweetheart') by Herbert and Marx from The Fortune Teller (operetta)

== See also ==
- Gipsy Love
