= Lizabeth Scott on screen and stage =

Filmography and stage appearances

Lizabeth Scott (1921–2015) appeared in 22 feature films from 1945 to 1972. In addition to stage and radio, she appeared on television from the late 1940s to early 1970s.

== Stage ==
Lizabeth Scott attended Scranton's Central High School, where she performed in several plays. After graduating, she spent the summer working with the Mae Desmond Players at a stock theater in the nearby community of Newfoundland. She then travelled down to Abingdon, Virginia and worked at the Barter Theatre. After an 18-month tour of 63 cities across the US with one of the three Hellzapoppin companies touring the US, Scott returned to New York City in the spring of 1942, where she joined a summer stock company at the 52nd Street Theatre on the subway circuit, the then equivalent of off-Broadway. Eventually, she starred as Sadie Thompson in John Colton's play Rain (1923). This role lead to Scott being chosen for as understudy for Tallulah Bankhead's Sabina, the leading lady role in the first Broadway production of The Skin of Our Teeth. Scott only played Sabina twice on Broadway, but replaced Miriam Hopkins for two weeks in the Boston run. As a Paramount contract player, Scott returned to the stage in 1949 as the titular character in Anna Lucasta.

No.	Title, US production run	Company, producer	Director, playwright	Scott's role	Leading man	Costars
1	Rain (Off-Broadway 1942 run)	52nd Street Theatre Company	John Colton (playwright)	Sadie Thompson		
2	Hellzapoppin (National tour 1940–1942 run)		John Olsen and Harold Johnson (playwrights)	Elizabeth Scott	Billy House	Eddie Garr
3	The Skin of Our Teeth (Broadway 1942–1943 run)	Michael Myerberg (producer)	Elia Kazan, Thornton Wilder	Girl/Drum Majorette, Sabina	Fredric March	Tallulah Bankhead, Montgomery Clift, E. G. Marshall
4	The Skin of Our Teeth (Boston 1943 run)	Michael Myerberg	Thornton Wilder	Sabina		
5	Anna Lucasta (Princeton, New Jersey 1949 run)		Philip Yordan (playwright)	Anna Lucasta		
6	Anna Lucasta (East Hartford, Connecticut 1949 run)		Philip Yordan	Anna Lucasta		

== Filmography ==
Though Lizabeth Scott began as a comedian on stage (Hellzapoppin, The Skin of Our Teeth), her film career is associated with film noir by film historians and public alike. Of the 22 feature films she starred in, 15 of them are noir-themed. Scott appeared in traditional black-and-white noirs, as well as noir variants, which include Western (Silver Lode), color (Desert Fury), comedy (Scared Stiff), Science Fiction (Stolen Face) and drama (The Company She Keeps).

With the exception of her Variety Girl cameo, Scott was the leading lady for all films she appeared in (she shared top billing with Barbara Stanwyck in The Strange Love of Martha Ivers). While Scott was signed to Paramount Pictures, she was often on loan to other studios, as was the standard practice during the studio system era. She worked with half of the eight major studios during the Golden Age of film. As a result, almost half her output and several of her best known films were with studios other than Paramount.

* indicates films in the public domain. See cites for copyright renewal dates.

Year	Title	Role
1945	You Came Along*	Ivy Hotchkiss
1946	The Strange Love of Martha Ivers*	Toni Marachek
1947	Dead Reckoning	"Dusty" Chandler
1947	Desert Fury	Paula Haller
1947	Variety Girl	Lizabeth Scott
1947	I Walk Alone	Kay Lawrence
1948	Pitfall	Mona Stevens
1949	Too Late for Tears*	Jane Palmer
1949	Easy Living	Liza Wilson
1950	Paid in Full*	Jane Langley
1950	Dark City	Fran Garland
1951	The Company She Keeps	Joan Willburn
1951	Two of a Kind	Brandy Kirby
1951	The Racket	Irene Hayes
1951	Red Mountain	Chris
1952	Stolen Face	Alice Brent / Lily Conover
1953	Scared Stiff	Mary Carroll
1953	Bad for Each Other	Helen Curtis
1954	Silver Lode	Rose Evans
1956	The Weapon	Elsa Jenner
1957	Loving You	Glenda Markle
1972	Pulp	Betty Cippola

== Radio ==
During the Golden Age of Radio, Scott would reprise her film roles in abridged radio versions. Typical were her appearances on Lux Radio Theatre: You Came Along with Van Johnson in the Robert Cummings role and I Walk Alone. Scott would also recreate on radio the original film roles of other actresses such as Loretta Young (The Perfect Marriage) and Veronica Lake (Saigon). Scott would even reprise Barbara Stanwyck's role in The Strange Love of Martha Ivers. One notable radio performance was the Molle Mystery Theatre episode, Female Of The Species, in which Scott is Eva Lester, the owner of a beauty salon. Lester tries to murder the rich wife of a man she is having an affair with. Scott was also a guest host/narrator on Family Theater.

No.	Title, US release year	Studio, producer	Director, script-writer	Scott's role	Leading man	Costars
1	Lux Radio Theatre "You Came Along" (January 7, 1946)	CBS	Fred MacKaye, Robert Smith	Ivy "Hotcha" Hotchkiss	Van Johnson	Don DeFore, Colleen Collins, Jeff Corey, Betty Bryan
2	Molle Mystery Theatre "Female Of The Species" (June 7, 1946)	NBC	Irene Winslow (script-writer)	Eva Lester		
3	Family Theater "The Perfect Wife" (November 13, 1947)	Family Theater Productions	James Fee (script-writer)	Herself (hostess/ narrator)	Ralph Morgan	Spring Byington
4	Proudly We Hail "The Triumphant Road" (1948)	US Army/ Air Force	Eddie Skrivanek (director)			
5	The Screen Guild Theater "Desert Fury" (January 12, 1948)	CBS, Bill Lawrence	Bill Lawrence (director)	Paula Haller	John Hodiak	Burt Lancaster, Mary Astor, Wendall Corey
6	Lux Radio Theatre "The Perfect Marriage" (December 4, 1948)	CBS		Jenny Williams	Ray Milland	
7	Lux Radio Theatre "I Walk Alone" (May 24, 1948)	CBS		Kay Lawrence	Burt Lancaster	Kirk Douglas, Wendell Corey
8	Lux Radio Theatre "Pitfall" (November 8, 1948)	CBS		Mona Stevens	Dick Powell	Jane Wyatt
9	Radio City Playhouse "Machine" (August 18, 1949)	NBC, Richard P. McDonough	Harry W. Junkin (director and script-writer)	Mary Hillman		
10	Lux Radio Theatre "Saigon" (September 5, 1949)	CBS		Susan Cleaver	John Lund	
11	Lux Radio Theatre "California" (January 30, 1950)	CBS		Lily Bishop	Ray Milland	
12	Stars Over Hollywood "Night Operator" (March 29, 1952)	CBS	Paul Pierce (director)	Laurie Ann McCrae	Harry Bartell	Verna Felton, Don Diamond, Louise Arthur, Sidney Miller
13	Stars In The Air "The Strange Love Of Martha Ivers" (April 17, 1952)	CBS	Harry Cronman (director, script-writer)	Martha Ivers	Dan Duryea	Joseph Kearns, Herb Vigran, Bob Sweeney
14	Guest Star "The Coward" (March 20, 1955)	US Treasury Department	Louis Graf (director)		John Larch	Dick Beals, Frank Nelson

== Television ==
Lizabeth Scott transitioned from the radio versions of programs she previously voiced. She continued to guest host for the television version of Family Theater, as well as acting in the then new Lux Video Theatre. Returning to her vaudeville origins, she also appeared in variety programs like the Colgate Comedy Hour and made her singing debut on The Big Record. The 1960s saw Scott continuing to guest-star on television, including a notable 1960 episode of Adventures in Paradise, "The Amazon," opposite Gardner McKay. In Burke's Law "Who Killed Cable Roberts?" (1963), she appears as the widow of a celebrity big game hunter. Scott returned to 20th Century Fox to film "The Luck of Harry Lime" (1965), an episode of The Third Man. She was directed by her former costar Paul Henreid from Stolen Face. She also appeared on the occasional game show opposite actors like John Wayne and George Hamilton.

No.	Title, US release year	Studio, producer	Director, screen- writer	Scott's role	Leading man	Costars
1	Family Theater "The Denver Express" (August 31, 1949)*	St. Paul Films		Herself (hostess, narrator)	Regis Toomey	
2	The Colgate Comedy Hour (October 19, 1952)*	NBC, Colgate Palmolive	Edward Sobel; John Grant, Elwood Ullman	Herself (and characters in sketches)	Abbott and Costello	Gisele MacKenzie; The Four Pipers, Les Dassie, Sid Fields, Dudley Dickerson, Milt Bronson, Bobby Barber
3	Lux Video Theatre "Amo, Amas, Amat" (December 1, 1952)*	J. Walter Thompson Agency, Cal Kuhl	Richard Goode, Anne Howard Bailey	Margaret Bailey	Ralph Meeker	Oliver Thorndike
4	Lux Video Theatre "Make Believe Bride" (June 11, 1953)*	J. Walter Thompson Agency, Cal Kuhl	Howard Loeb, Anne Howard Bailey; Mona Williams (story)	Betsy	Don DeFore	Glenn Anders
5	Studio 57 "I'll Always Love You, Natalie" (December 12, 1955)	Revue Productions	Lawrence Kimble (screenwriter)	Clara Townsley	Patric Knowles	William Roerick, Edward Platt, Ed Reimers
6	The 20th Century Fox Hour "Overnight Haul" (May 16, 1956)	20th Century Fox Television, Peter Packer	Jules Bricken, Leonard Freeman	Frances Fowler	Richard Conte	Richard Eyer
7	Adventures in Paradise "The Amazon" (March 21, 1960)	20th Century Fox Television, Richard Goldstone	Joseph Lejtes, William Froug	Carla MacKinley	Gardner McKay	Claude Akins, Tom Drake
8	Burke's Law "Who Killed Cable Roberts?" (October 4, 1963)	Four Star, Aaron Spelling	Jeffrey Hayden, Gwen Bagni	Mona Roberts	Gene Barry	Paul Lynde, Mary Astor, Zsa Zsa Gabor, John Saxon
9	The Third Man "The Luck of Harry Lime" (August 27, 1965)*	20th Century Fox Television, John Llewellyn Moxey	Paul Henreid, Gene Wang	Diane Masters	Michael Rennie	Jonathan Harris, Willis Bouchey

Titles in the public domain.* See cites for copyright renewal dates.
