= Margaret Risser =

American actress

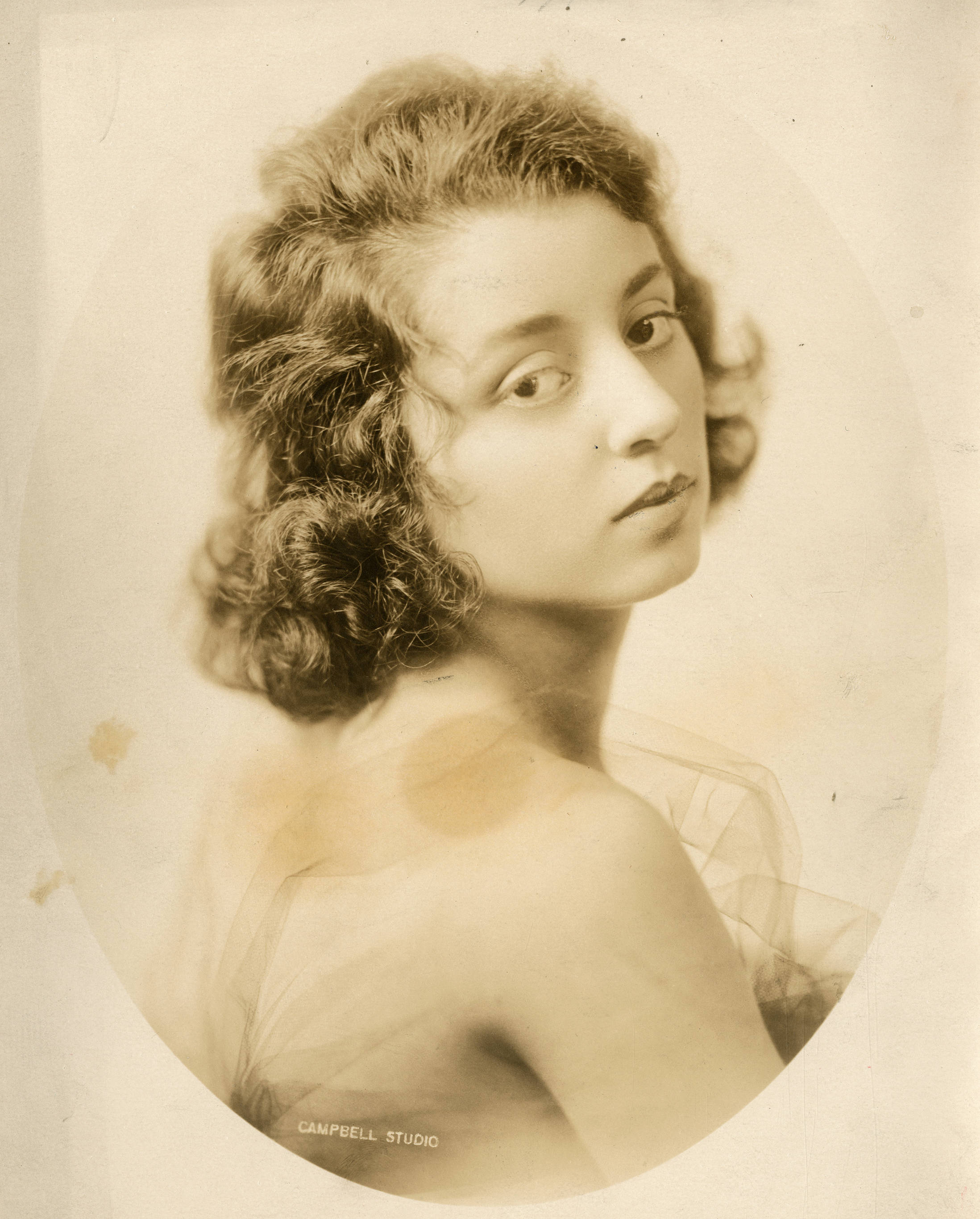

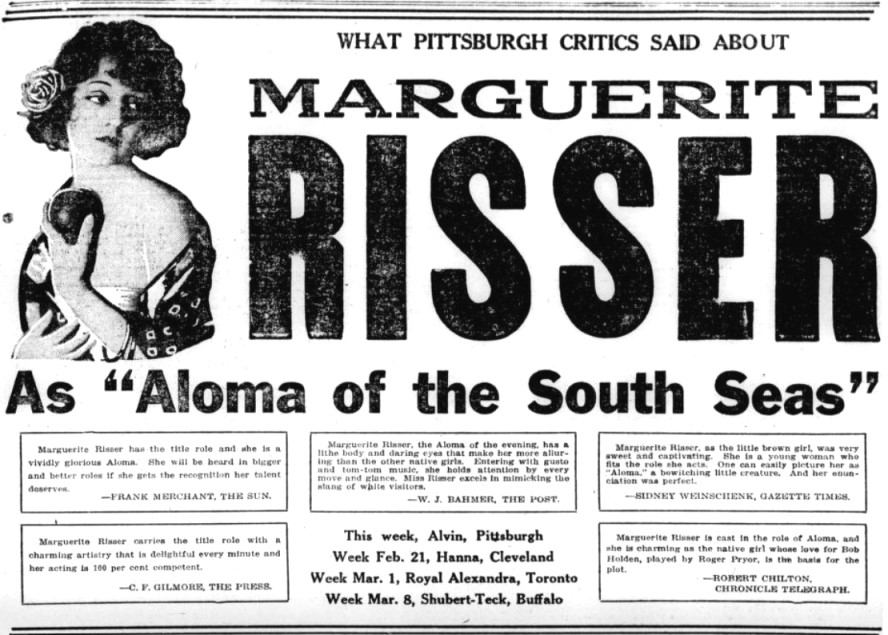

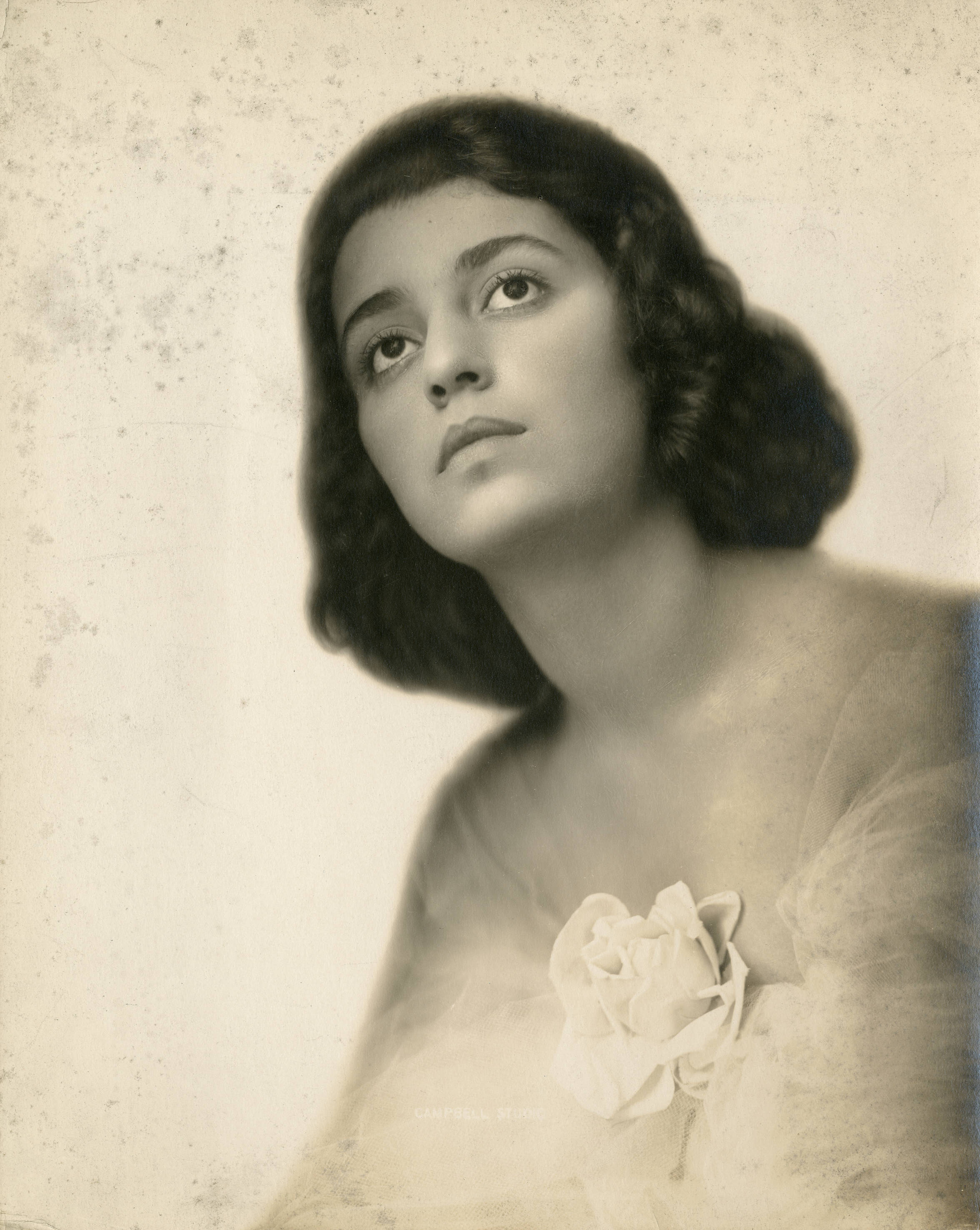

Margaret Risser, also known as Marguerite Risser, was an actress in the United States who appeared on stage and screen.

She and Grace Cunard featured in Carmen Complexion Powder advertisements.

She was the niece of Kathryn Osterman. The Library of Congress has a photo of her from 1915.

== Theater ==
- The Whirlwind (opened December 23, 1919)
- Red Lily replacing Margot Kelly
- The Monster by Crane Wilbur
- Naked by Luigi Pirandello
- Aloma of the South Seas (1926) staging of the 1925 play by John B. Hymer and LeRoy Clemens

== Filmography ==
- The Finger of Fate (1913)
- The Society Woman (1913) (credited as Marguerite Risser)
- The Couple Next Door (1913) as Gertrude (credited as Marguerite Risser)
- The Mystery of the Crimson Trail (1913) as The Farmer's Daughter
- A Phony Alarm (1913) as Alice
- Too Many Tenants (1913) as The Artist's Sweetheart
- Gypsy Love (1914)
- The Millionaire's Ward (1913) as Rose - the Millionaire's Ward
- The Depth of Hate (1913)
- The Lodgekeeper's Daughter (1913) (as Marguerite Risser)
- Threads of Destiny (1914) as Rachel Shapiro
- All Love Excelling (1914) as Valeria
- On the Chess Board of Fate (1914)
- Good Pals (1914) with Shep the Dog as Beatrice Kane (credited as Marguerite Risser)
