= Bronx Opera House =

Hotel and former theater in New York City

The Bronx Opera House
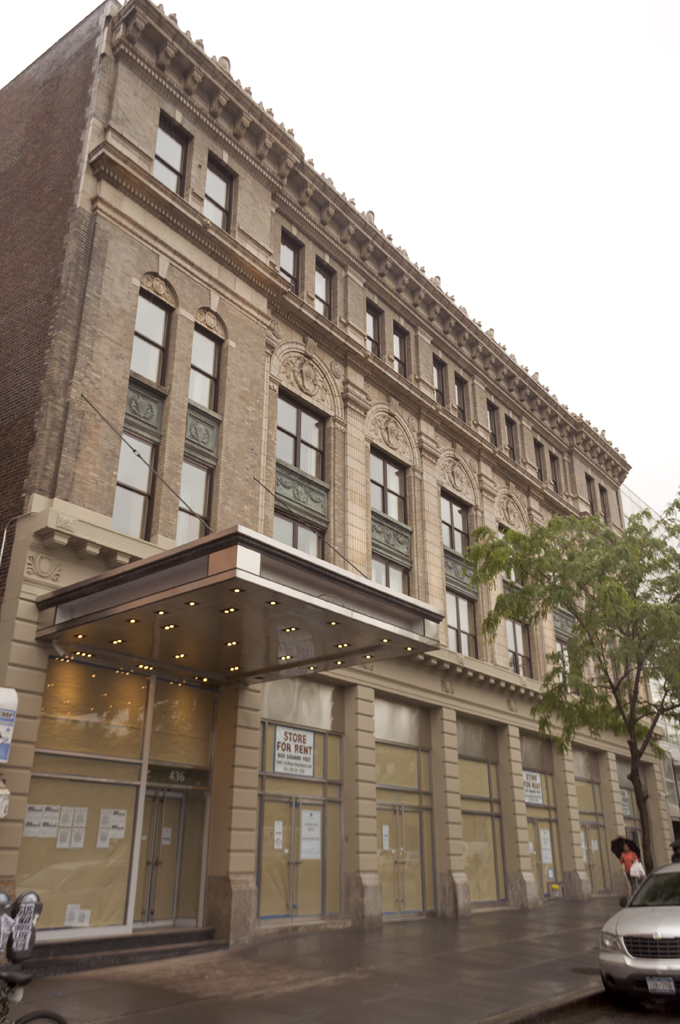
- The Opera House Hotel, still under construction at the end of May 2013

General information
- Type: Boutique Hotel (opened August 11, 2013)
- Location: 436 E 149th St; Bronx, NY 10455; United States
- Coordinates: 40.8151°N 73.9161°W
- Construction started: September 1912
- Completed: August 1913
- Opening: August 30, 1913
- Cost: $300,000

Design and construction
- Architect: George M. Keister
- Main contractor: Cramp & Co.

The Bronx Opera House is a former theater, part of the Subway Circuit, now converted into a boutique hotel in the Melrose neighborhood of the Bronx, New York City. It was designed by George M. Keister and built in 1913 at 436 East 149th Street on the site of Frederick Schnaufer's stable. It was one of several theaters to come into the area that became known as the Hub. It was formally dedicated on opening night Saturday, August 30, 1913.

Performers included the Marx Brothers, George Burns, Gracie Allen, Julia Marlowe, Ethel Barrymore and Lionel Barrymore, David Warfield. Other performers at the theatre included George M. Cohan, Eddie Cantor, John Bunny, Harry Houdini, Peggy Wood and Fats Waller. Post-Broadway shows were often performed and the theater hosted the Aborn Opera Company.

The Bronx Opera House is often confused with the Percy G. Williams' New Bronx Opera House built in 1909 and located at 567 Melrose Avenue (corner of 150th Street), later renamed the B.F. Keith's Bronx Theatre, which was a different venue featuring vaudeville shows.

== Design ==
It had a capacity of 1,892 seats divided as follows: 799 orchestra (floor) seats, 537 balcony seats, 478 gallery seats and 78 box seats. The stage had a proscenium opening of 34x28 ft. and a 4 ft. apron. The theatre was equipped with 110 A.C. electricity. The backstage area featured 12 dressing rooms.

The building, its façade still standing today, has a 97-foot-wide (30 m) fronting on 149th Street, between Bergen and Brook Avenue, and it runs back 205 feet to 148th Street. A three-story commercial building was on 149th Street. That space, apart from the 25-foot lobby leading to the theater, was originally leased to William Gibson and Gustave Beiswenger as a restaurant, café and banquet hall on the first and second floor named the Bronx Opera House Restaurant, the third floor being used as lodge rooms.

Emphasis was put on fire safety. An area-way demanded by the Department of Public Safety ran from street to street on either side of the theatre, affording ample space for substantial steel stairways leading down from the emergency exits.

An automatic asbestos safety curtain fronted the entr'acte drop, which was decorated with a damask valance separated into three sections, fringed with galloons. The centre of each section was embroidered with an embossed wreath, giving them a rich effect, materially enhanced by a highlight gold border running the full width of the curtain.

At the time of its opening, the color scheme of the house's interior was ivory, green and old gold. The decorations were in the Italian Renaissance style. The ornamental work on the ceiling and box fronts and columns was old gold. The ornamental plaster work had been treated with an ivory tint, stenciled to harmonized with the wall coverings which were of silk damask. The body of the silk damask wall decorations was of a light green pattern harmonizing in color. Draperies of the same character in heavy velvet, treated with gold, with ornate center wreath medallions, constituted the box decorations.

Three mural paintings were adorning the auditorium ceiling. These represented the Temple of Love, Love Accused Before Jove, and Repose and Laughter. In the foyer and aisles were carpets of green, two shades darker than the wall coverings and draperies.

A feature of the Bronx Opera House was the diffused lighting arrangements. The sunburst, or center ceiling light fixture, was five feet in diameter. The small lights of the auditorium were so arranged as to be concealed from the eye. The second balcony and main auditorium were equipped with the same indirect alba glass globes.

Ventilation was achieved by a system of tubing built in the walls and foundations leading to and connecting on the roof with a high-power electric fan that drove the cold air down under the concrete floor of the auditorium, into which it was filtered by way of innumerable colanders installed under seats, making it possible to keep the temperature of the interior "healthful", no matter what conditions prevailed outside.

== Development and construction (1911–1913) ==
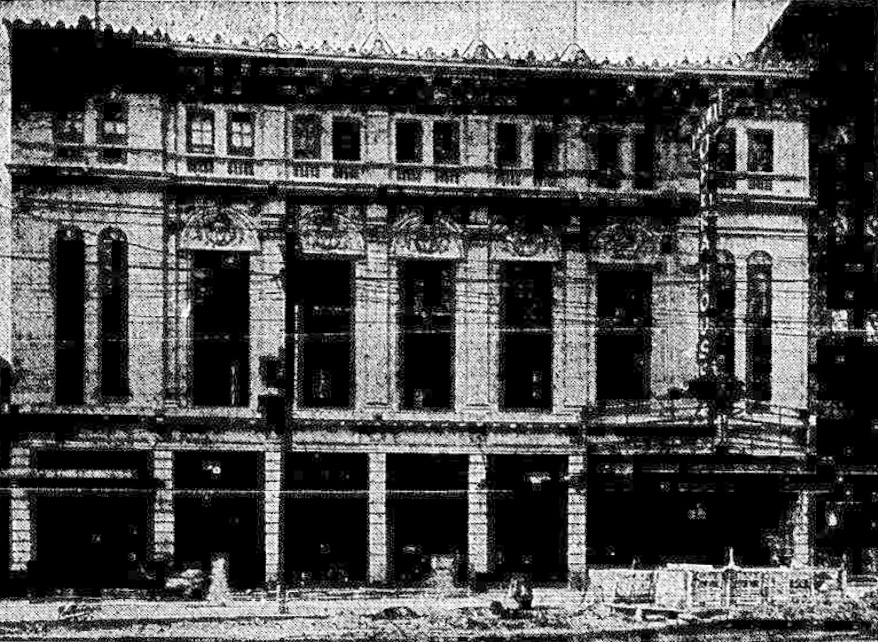
The Bronx Opera House at the end of its construction phase in August 1913

George M. Cohan and Sam H. Harris had the idea of building a combination theater above the Harlem River probably as early as 1911 as they were actively looking for a site at the very beginning of 1912. The trade newspaper Variety was reporting at the time that the two sites considered were at 150th street and Westchester Avenue and the other at 163rd Street and Prospect Avenue.

Speculations were Cohan and Harris had secured a contract from Morgenthau-Hudson realty to build a 1,600 seats theatre for them at the 150th Street location. Variety announced on January 20, 1912, that the Shuberts were planning to build a legitimate house in the Bronx as well. New York theater managers generally felt that while the Bronx was a fertile field for one such theatre to show the Broadway attractions at reasonable prices (all of the other theaters in the neighborhood were vaudeville), two theaters of similar policy in that section would only mean that either would be fortunate to break even. A bitter competition already existed between Cohan & Harris' Grand Opera House at 8th Avenue and 23rd Street and the Shuberts' Manhattan Opera House at 34th Street. Sam H. Harris's attempt at negotiating a deal with Lee Shubert failed, and Cohan & Harris announced the following week they were walking out on the entire project.

In early May, Sam H. Harris confirmed to Variety they had secured a site on 149th Street just east of Third Avenue to build a sister theater to their Manhattan Grand Opera House and that it would be in operation by November. Details of the project were officially announced in June 1912. The Bronx Opera House was to be located at 438 to 444 East 149th Street, the lease secured from Frederick Schnaufer that same day. George M. Keister had designed the theater. Cohan & Harris, via their Bronx 149th Street Realty Company, had already leased the commercial space to Gibson and Beiswenger for a cafe, restaurant and banquet hall on 149th Street before construction has even begun.

Cohan and Harris still ended up facing competition in the Bronx, when, on August 29, John Cort announced the construction of the "Royal Theatre" in association with Frank Gersten. A combination house with a seating capacity of 2,500 located at Westchester Avenue, Third Avenue and 150th Street, four blocks away from the Bronx Opera House, was to be completed by December 15. When asked if he was interested in any new theaters in the city beyond the Harlem River, Harry Frazee was quoted by the New York Sun as saying he thanked the Creator that he had no project underway in the Bronx. Cramp & Co. was awarded the construction contract for the Bronx Opera House in September 1912; the structure was to be a fireproof building with exterior of brick, limestone and terra cotta requiring an expenditure of $250,000.

As construction gets quickly underway, a partnership is formed with A.H. Woods who came on board with an interest of one-third and an interest in management as well. There is little or no excavation to be done and the then-estimated 2,500-seat house is expected to be ready by December. Observers saw the partnership either as an attempt by the two firms to break free from the Syndicates or an attempt to become their own Syndicate altogether. Both parties denied the rumors. In the meantime, the development of its direct competitor, Cort and Gersten's Royal Theatre, was delayed by a variety of factors, including building violations in February 1913. Two months later, the Shuberts and Klaw & Erlanger announced that they would play all their shows at the Bronx Opera House, shutting out the Royal Theatre.

== Theatrical seasons ==
Robert Edeson as Robert Reynolds and Lolita Robertson as Jane Reynolds in 1912 for the original stage production of Fine Feathers

=== 1913–1914 ===
Manager: Richard Madden
Treasurer: Harry Cullen

Show times: Evening, 8:15 pm, matinees (Wed., Sat. and holidays), 2.15 pm
Ticket prices: twenty-five cents to a dollar with bargain matinees at twenty-five and fifty cents.

The Bronx Opera House was officially dedicated on August 30, 1913, and opens with Eugene Walter's play Fine Feathers. The Bronx Opera House opens its doors to "an immense audience" with Frazee's production of Fine Feathers. It's a scene long to be remembered as the crowd gathers around the entrance. Old Bronxites stand amazed as car after car whirls up to the curb and discharges its burden of fashion, wealth and beauty. It's Broadway transferred uptown. Longacre Square at its busiest hour could not show a more fashionable or a more cultured assemblage. Long before opening time, the street is jammed with a good-humored crowd.

Inside, George Cohan, Sam H. Harris, A. H. Woods and Harry Frazee all attend the performance. There is also a delegation from the New York Friars' Club in the audience, George Cohan being the Abbot of the organization at the time. Sam Harris is indefatigable and everywhere, acting as manager, usher and doorman. Max Figman, who plays in Fine Feathers, delivered an address presenting the theatre on behalf of the management and the address of acceptance on behalf of the people of the Bronx was made by Assemblyman Louis D. Gibbs. Outside, the crowd gathering was such that the police was called to clear the sidewalk and the street. The play was a huge hit and at the end of the last act, the cast answered to six curtain calls.

Fine Feathers concludes a successful nine-day engagement and is replaced the following week by the de Koven Opera Company production of Robin Hood. Attendance for the second week is described as a "large audience". One hit of this first season was Broadway Jones, a comedy written, produced, directed and played by George M. Cohan in his own brand new theater in the Bronx. It was a vehicle for his farewell tour as an actor and both his parents were on stage with him. The singer-actor Fiske O'Hara went on the stage of the Bronx Opera House for the first time October 13, 1913, in a production of In Old Dublin. Middleton's The Prodigal Judge premiered December 8, 1913; on that night, every seat was occupied, even the boxes being filled with first-nighters.

=== 1914–1915 ===
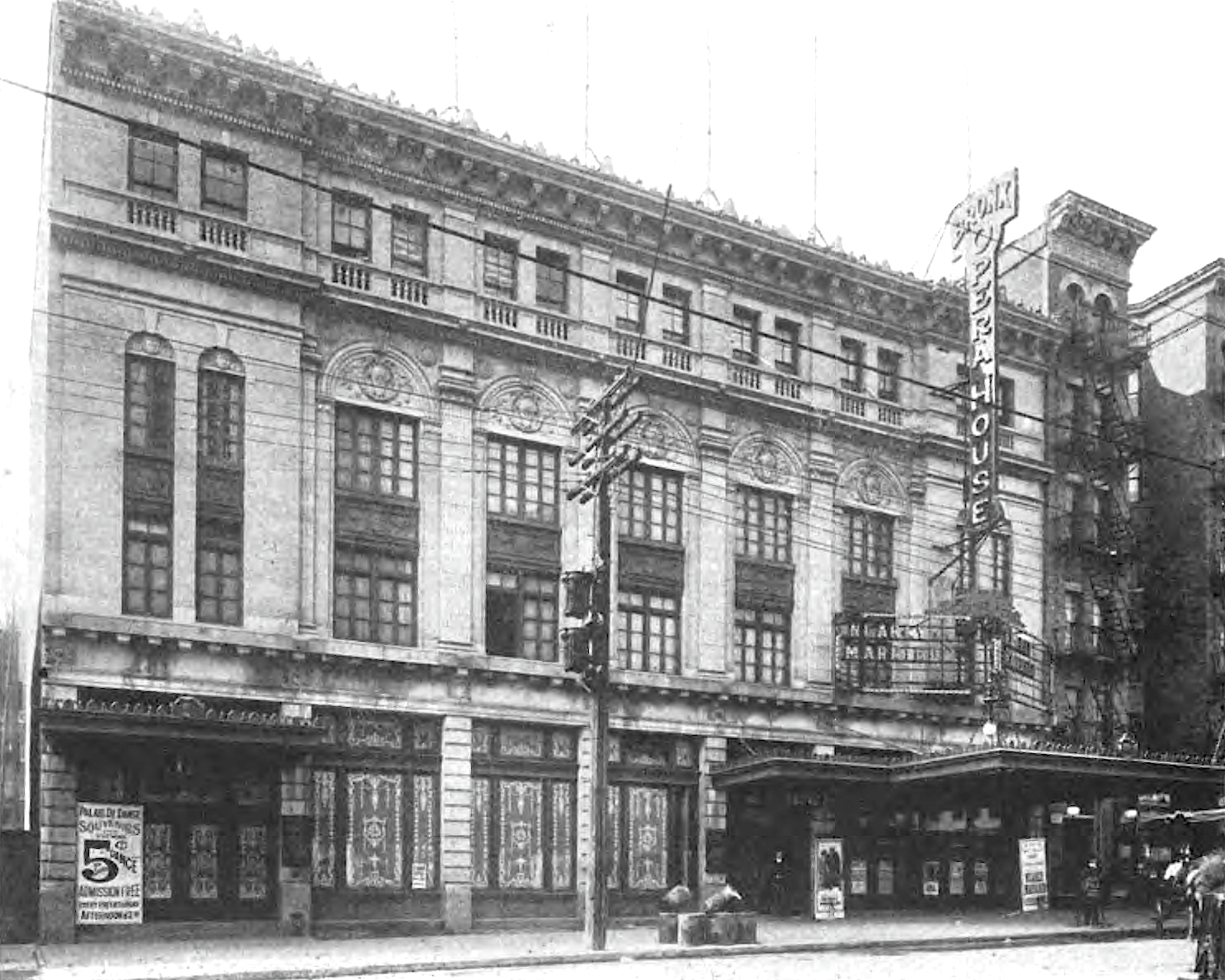
Bronx Opera House in March 1914

In its November 7, 1914 edition, Variety estimates that "The Story of the Rosary" brought in $6,900 to the Bronx Opera House but that the theatre has had an average of 9 to $10,000 per week since the beginning of the season – pretty good considering the 1914–1915 season showed an almost unbroken line of failures at the box office in the industry in general. Although poor performance is generally attributed to war uncertainties, the Bronx Opera House good numbers are most likely due to the elimination of the Royal Theatre. By mid January 1915 it is estimated to be the most profitable combination theater in New York with an average business of $8,000 a week. Potash and Perlmutter alone did an estimated $9,900 in one week and The Crinoline Girl $9,700.

A motion picture was shown for the first time at the Bronx Opera House on December 14. A silent documentary titled Belgian War Scenes, it featured an actual battle in progress, shells bursting, men falling in the trenches and the care of the wounded.

John Barrymore is on stage April 19 for a week in Willard Mack's Kick-In.

=== 1915–1916 ===
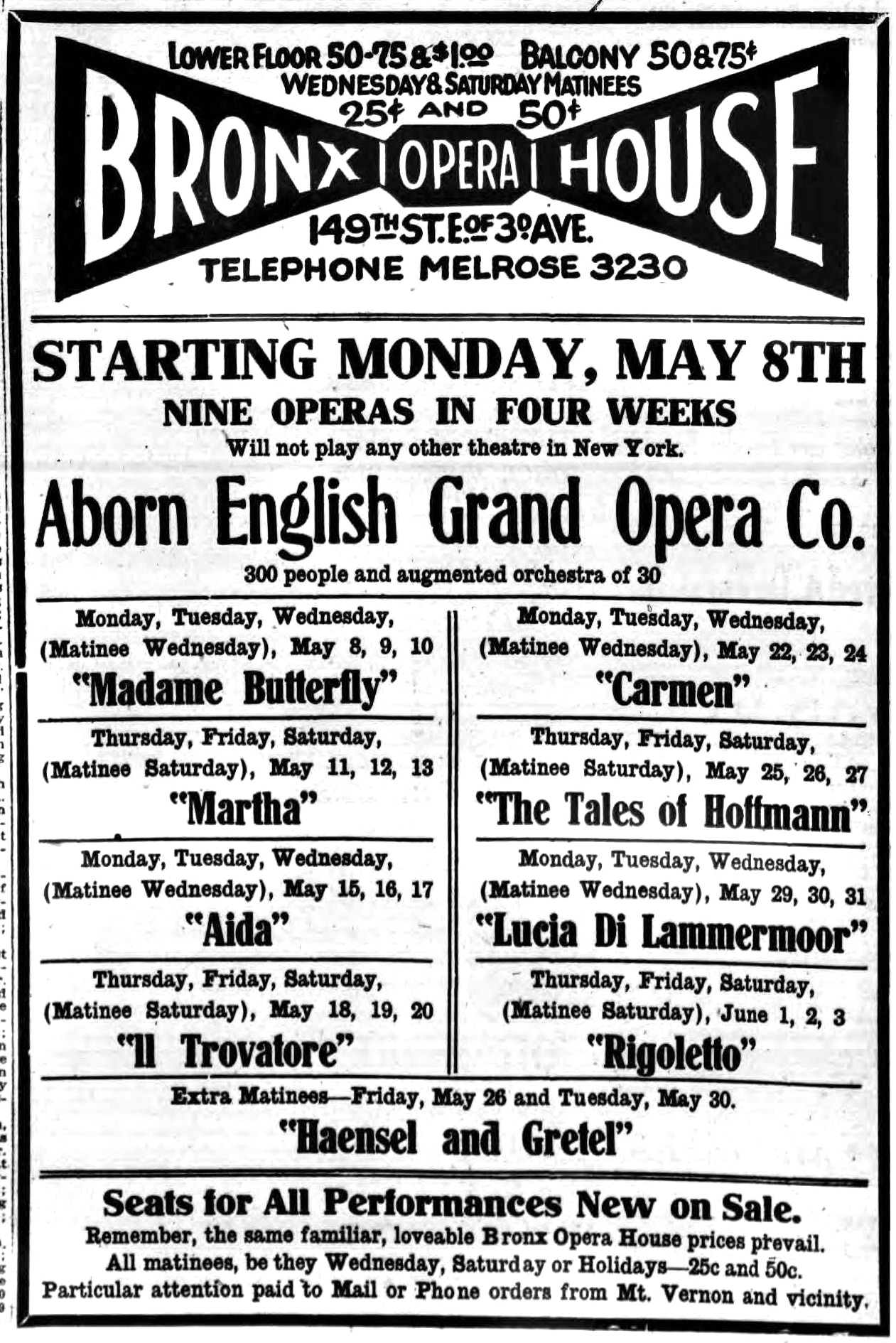
Newspaper Ad for the Aborn Opera Company's program in the Spring of 1916

J. J. Rosenthal was the manager. The show times were 8:15 pm for evening shows and 2:15 pm for matinees (Wednesdays, Saturdays, and holidays). Ticket prices ranged from twenty-five cents to a dollar with bargain matinees at twenty-five and fifty cents.

A young Richard Dix was on the stage of the Bronx Opera House on December 7 for a one-week engagement of The Hawk.

D. W. Griffith's The Birth of a Nation was shown for two weeks accompanied by a thirty-piece orchestra. It was scheduled for an encore presentation on May 1, 1916, but was cancelled to make room for The House of Glass.

On June 7, during the six-week engagement of the Aborn Opera Company, Beppo, a donkey who was appearing on stage in Pagliacci, was tied by its keeper to a car parked in front of the theater. The Aborn Company was putting on Cavalleria Rusticana after Pagliacci and the keeper whose sympathies were divided between mules and music thought to slip back in the theater and hear an aria or two. When the keeper came out, the red car was gone and so was Beppo the donkey, a ten-year veteran of the stage.

=== 1916–1917 ===
Common Clay breaks the house record on September 4 (Labor Day) drawing $9,697.

John Barrymore is back on the stage of the Bronx Opera House September 26 in John Galsworthy's Justice.

Julian Eltinge returns to the Bronx Opera House on Christmas Day with Cousin Lucy, a show so successful the previous season, it had been extended a second week. The cast remains the same but this 1916 production of the show features new songs, new music and new costumes, "those who saw it before will have to rub their eyes to make sure they are not really looking at a new production".

=== 1917–1918 ===
Manager J. J. Rosenthal fired the first gun of the theatrical season by giving a monster patriotic benefit August 19, 1917. The theatre has been redecorated and with the Golden Lobby of fame looking more attractive than ever, is ready to receive Emma Dunn in Old Lady 31, Saturday, August 25 as the opening attraction of the regular season.

John and Lionel Barrymore are on stage November 19 in John Raphael's play Peter Ibbetson.

The third mini-season of the Aborn Opera Company does not fare as well as the previous two. The contract's terms were the same: booked for three weeks with more time optional. However returns were not found satisfactory and their engagement ended after only two weeks.

=== 1918–1919 ===
J.J. Rosenthal was the manager until December 1918, and Mike Selwyn was manager from January through June 1919. The treasurer was Maurice Louis Silverstein, while the doorman was August L. Heckler.

The Bronx Opera House starts to experiment with ticket price increases. "Going Up" opens March 17 to a new scale of matinees: 25 cents to 75 cents; evenings: 25 cents to $1.50.

=== 1919–1920 ===
At the start of the season, the Riviera at 97th street (also part of the Subway Circuit) raise its top prices from $1 to $1.50, the Bronx Opera House quickly follows. This is the first permanent increase in ticket prices in 6 years but an expected one. Times Square theatres have titled their price scale to $2.50 and in some instances when the show is a hit, up to $3.50. Prices won't remain at $1.50 for long. October sees record Box Office numbers due higher prices. By the end of November 1919, Subway Circuit theaters are already considering raising their ticket prices to $2. The Riviera will again take the lead and make the price hike effective December 22.

== Later years ==
When it opened the opera house was considered the best theatre in the borough. It had two separate balconies and a large crystal chandelier in the center of the ceiling. Performances included vaudeville and plays.

By the 1940s, the building was converted to a late-run movie house, shuttering of the upper balcony reduced seating to 1,400, and became known simply as Bronx Theatre. The theatre lost its license in 1943 after the rape of a 17-year-old worker. Chief Assistant District Attorney Sylvester Ryan said "the theatre as a rendezvous for degenerates and thugs." Eight youths were sentenced to reformatory for the crime. The theatre flourished during the 1950s, 1960s and 1970s as a Latin music dance club operating as Bronx Casino, Club Caravana and El Cerromar. In the 1980s it was purchased by a pentecostal church. Charlie Palmieri recorded Pachanga at the Caravana Club on site in 1961.

Visits to the theatre are noted in the book Having Our Say: The Delany Sisters' First 100 Years.

== Rebirth as the Opera House Hotel ==
Renovation plans to relaunch it as a performing arts center developed in the 1980s but did not proceed. By 2004 the run-down auditorium was part of a Spanish evangelical church. The church had moved out before the end of the decade. The auditorium has not survived.

New construction began to convert part of the building into a boutique hotel named the Opera House Hotel. Those plans continued to develop in 2012. According to developer Jay Domb, performers at the theater included Harry Houdini and The Marx Brothers "got their vaudeville start here". Domb plans to decorate the hotel with relics and prints of artifacts from the theatre.

The hotel opened in August 2013 and is one of eight hotel properties owned and operated by the Empire Hotel Group. The hotel is the first of several boutique hotels which have opened or are being constructed in the Bronx.

In summer 2015 the hotel's water cooling tower was suspected in several cases of Legionnaires' disease that occurred across several buildings in the area.

In early 2023, the New York City Landmarks Preservation Commission placed the building under consideration for designation as an individual landmark, noting the building's significance to "Latino history and culture". The Bronx Opera House received landmark designation on June 13, 2023.
