= Jacob J. Rosenthal =

American theatre manager

- Died: July 12, 1923; New York City, U.S.
- Spouse: Kathryn Osterman (m. 1898)
- Children: 1

Jacob J. Rosenthal, also known as J.J. Rosenthal or Jake Rosenthal, was a theater manager best known for managing Cohan & Harris' Bronx Opera House. He was married to actress Kathryn Osterman with whom he had a son, the comedian Jack Osterman. He died July 12, 1923.

== Early career ==
He had been working as a police reporter for the Cincinnati Enquirer for two years when he decided to embark in the theatrical business as a press agent for theater managers John H. Havlin of the Havlin Theatre and Robert E.J. Miles of the Grand Opera House both in Cincinnati. In a brazen move that will become a trademark throughout his professional career, he secured an ad in red ink on the first page of the Cincinnati Enquirer announcing the coming of Effie Ellsler in Hazel Kirke. John R. McLean, the owner of the Enquirer, had publicly boasted that nobody had enough money to buy an ad on the first page of his newspaper. Somehow Jake had managed to not only get the ad for free but in red, infuriating McLean, who asked his employers to dismiss him.

Out of a job, he moved to New York City and quickly started working for the likes of Charles Frohman, Klaw & Erlanger and other theatrical producers.

On June 9, 1898, he married actress Kathryn Osterman in New York at the home of Kathryn's sister, actress Anna Belmont. Three years later, having moved to Toledo Ohio, they had a son, Jack, who became a comedian in vaudeville and movies under his mother's last name.

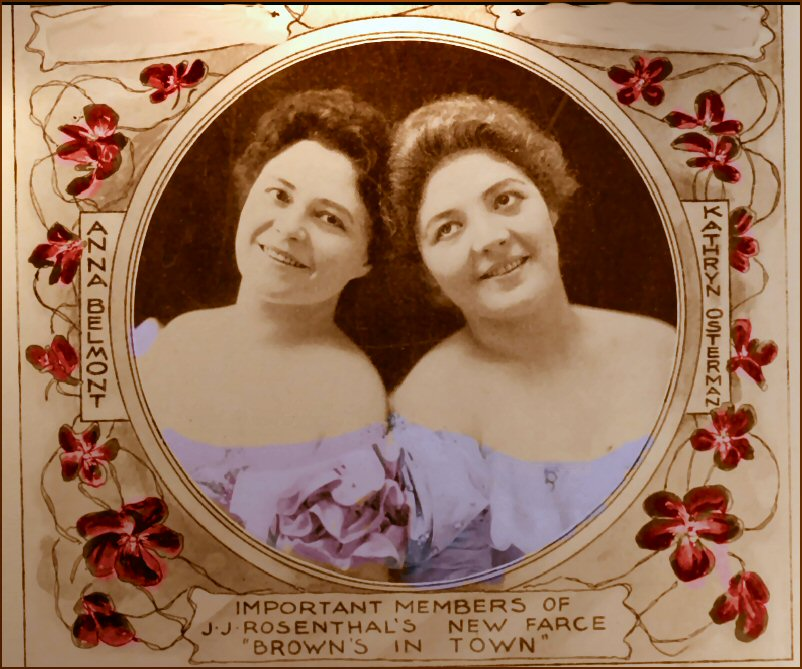
J. J. Rosenthal's "Brown's in Town" with his wife on the right (Osterman)

J.J. Rosenthal subsequently worked for A.H. Woods and is credited with bringing George Broadhurst to prominence and catapulting Julian Eltinge to stardom. He then managed his wife's tour for three seasons before becoming the manager of the Gaiety Theatre in San Francisco.

According to reports, in January 1914, he arranged for Marie Dressler tocome to the Gaiety when a contract had been signed for the showing of white-slave films (a popular genre in early cinema) at the house at the same time. A cash bond of $1,500, that had been put up as guarantee that the films would be put on at the time specified in the contract, was forfeited by the Gaiety's owner George M. Anderson. Jake Rosenthal was first fired verbally by Thomas O. Day of the Anderson executive forces, but because he was refusing to recognize his authority, Anderson himself had to later dismiss him by mail. Rosenthal sued the Anderson Company for $11,850 asking that an accounting be made for additional percentage per terms of contract. He attached the Gaiety receipts, but the management put up a bond and lifted it.

In 1915, citing that he was tired of being on the road, he accepted Cohan & Harris' offer to manage the Bronx Opera House.

== Bronx Opera House ==
Jacob J. Rosenthal took over the Bronx Opera House at the beginning of its third season following the departure of Richard Madden.
