= George Keister =

American architect

George W. Keister
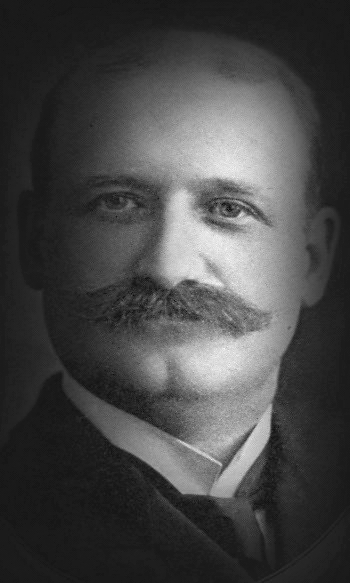
- Born: January 10, 1859; Bellevue, Iowa, US
- Died: December 27, 1945 (aged 86); New York City, US
- Occupation: Architect
- Buildings: Apollo Theater, Belasco Theatre, Bronx Opera House, Hotel Gerard, Todd Haimes Theatre

George W. Keister (January 10, 1859 – December 27, 1945) was an American architect. His work includes the Hotel Gerard (1893), the Astor Theatre (1906), the Belasco Theatre (1907), the Bronx Opera House (1913), the Apollo Theater in Harlem (1914), the Selwyn Theatre (now Todd Haimes Theatre, 1918), and the First Baptist Church in the City of New York. He also designed Woodbridge Hall at 431 Riverside Drive (1901), which faced demolition in 1996, and the Sigma Chi fraternity at 565 W. 113th St. (1903).

== History ==
George Keister was born in Bellevue, Iowa, on January 10, 1859, to George W. and Mary R. Keister, née MacMurphy. He was educated in the schools of his hometown and those of Rochester, Minnesota, where his family later moved. He attended Cornell College before moving to Boston to study architecture at the Massachusetts Institute of Technology. During this time he also studied in the architecture firms of Ware & Van Brunt and George F. Meacham. After leaving school he was a building superintendent in the office of Meacham for two years. In 1885 he went to New York to establish a private practice, and was nominally associated with Russell Sturgis until 1890.

Keister was a skilled but little known architect who was active in New York City from the mid-1880s into the third decade of the twentieth century. He had a brief partnership with Frank E. Wallis (1887–88) and in the 1890s, served as secretary of the Architectural League. Although barely a score of his buildings have been identified, the collection indicates a gifted and innovative architect with facile design ability in a variety of styles. Prior to David Belasco's Stuyvesant (now Belasco), he had designed three New York theaters: in 1905, the Colonial (Hampton's; at 1887 Broadway) and Loew's Yorkville Theater (157 East 86th Street), and the Astor Theater in the following year; all three have been demolished. Belasco's Stuyvesant Theater thus takes on the added significance of being the earliest extant theater of an architect who would later make theaters his specialty, executing at least a dozen others in New York by 1923.

Among his most notable were the George M. Cohan's Theatre (1911; demolished), the Bronx Opera House (1912–13), the Apollo Theater in Harlem (1913–14), Broadway's Selwyn Theater (1917–18, 229 West 42nd Street) and the Earl Carroll Theatre at 753-59 Seventh Avenue (1922; 1931 Art Deco remodeling; demolished).

Although the circumstances of his commission from Belasco are obscure, Keister was most likely known to the producer as architect of the Gerard Apartment Hotel (1893) which was located immediately west of the site of Belasco's new theater. Rising 13 stories on West 44th Street, this fine neo-medieval/neo-Renaissance composite was one of the tallest buildings in the area.

Among Keister's other notable commissions is the eccentrically massed First Baptist Church (1891) on the northwest corner of Broadway and 79th Street. Like Belasco's Stuyvesant, it features stained glass in its ceiling, although here rendered more boldly as a splendid stained glass barrel vault in appropriate ecclesiastical terms.

Keister's other works include neo-Grec and neo-Renaissance tenements in Greenwich Village, an eclectic group of rowhouses known as the Bertine Block (1891) on East 136th Street in the Bronx, the McAlpin-Miller residence at 9 East 90th Street (purchased by a daughter of Andrew Carnegie and now part of the Cooper-Hewitt Museum), as well as a neo-Gothic office building from 1925, located several doors west of the Belasco Theatre (No. 156).

== Works ==
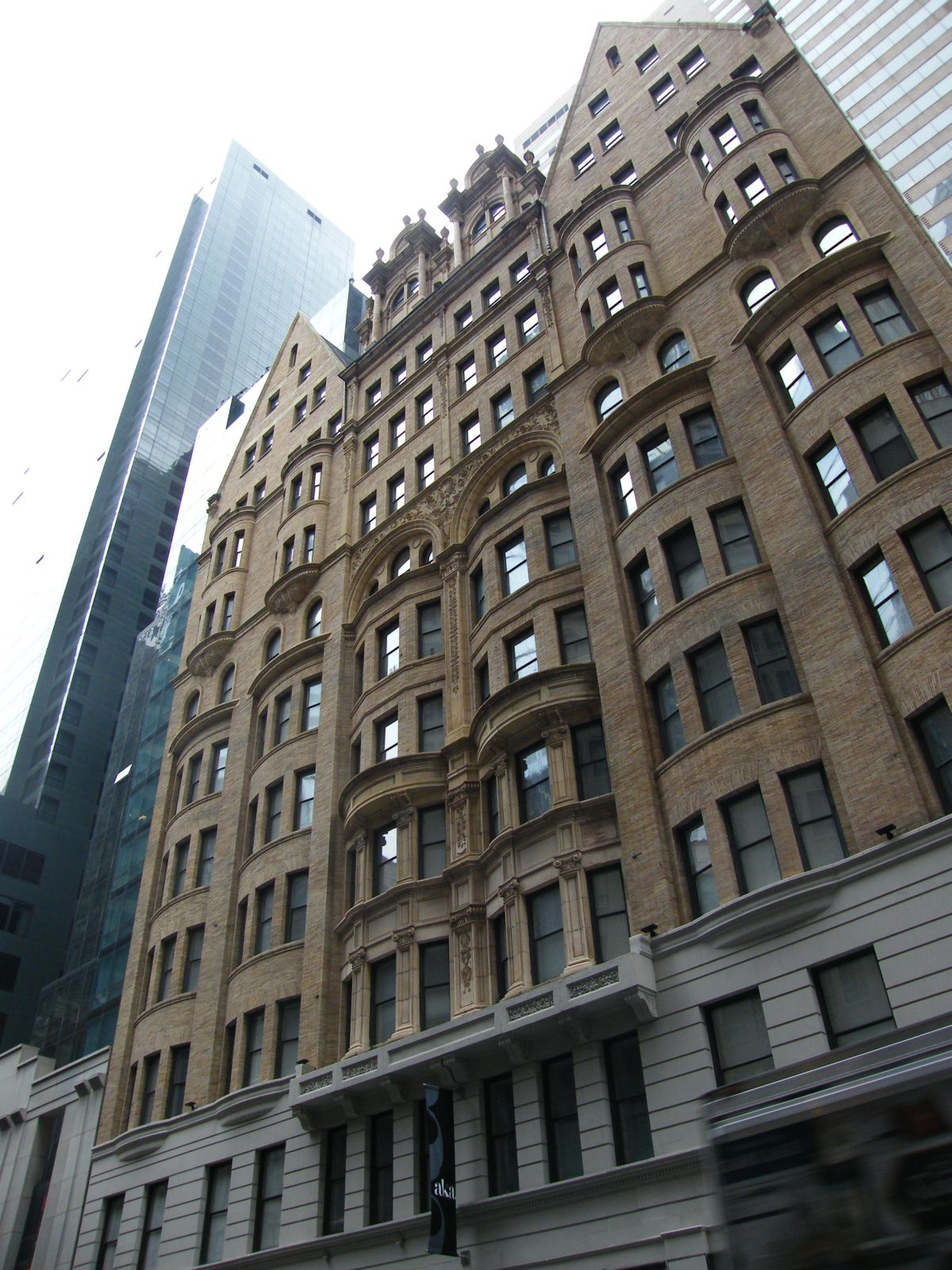
Hotel Gerard

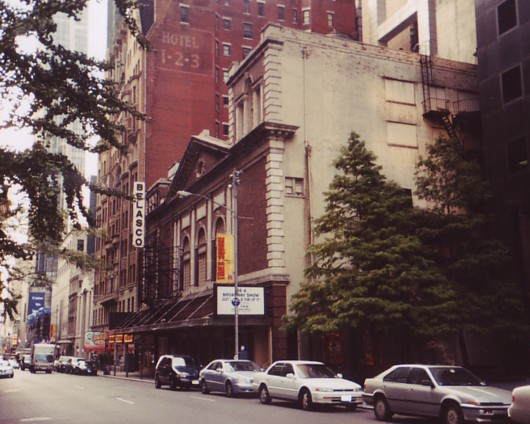
Belasco Theatre

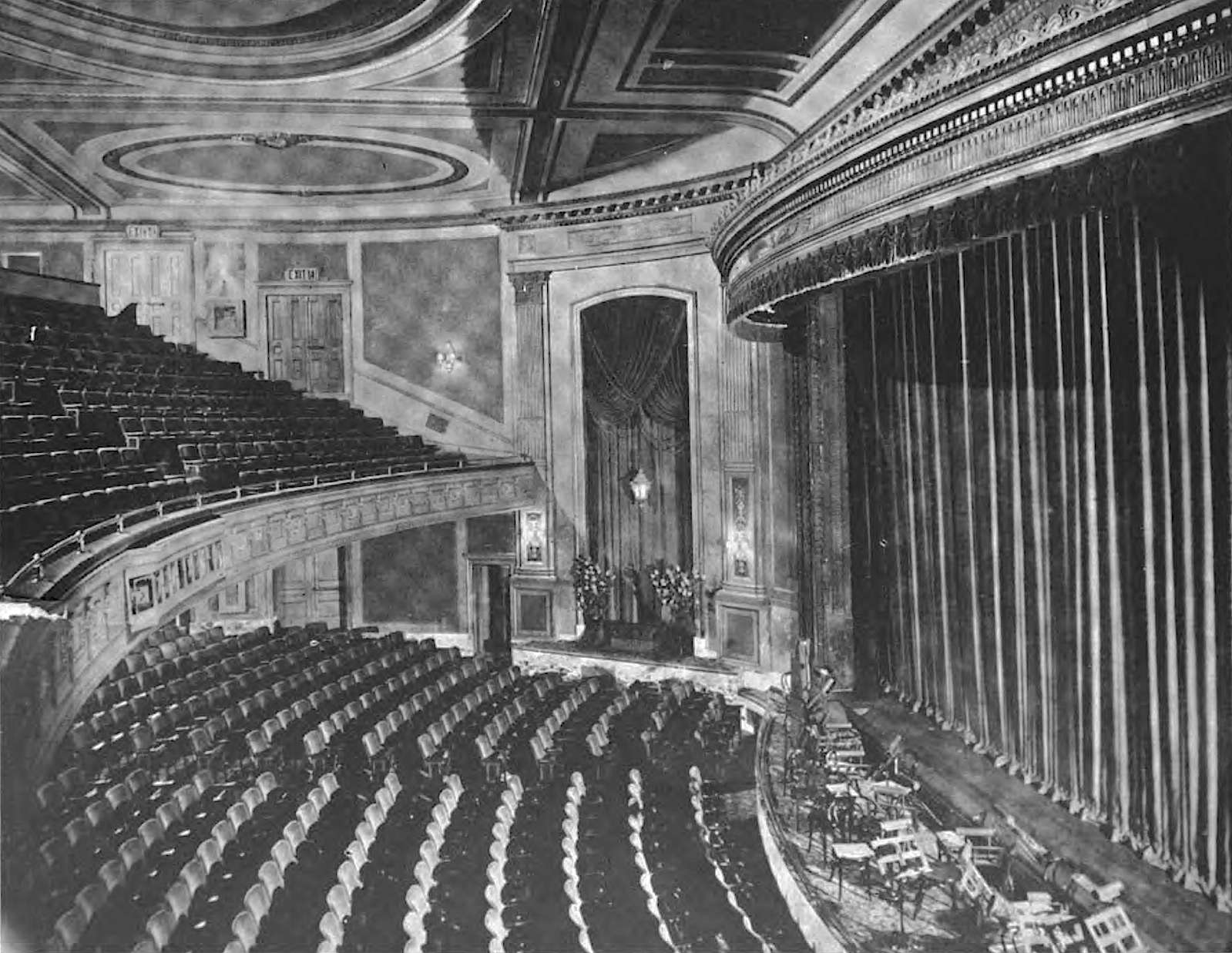
Earl Carroll Theatre, Manhattan, 1922

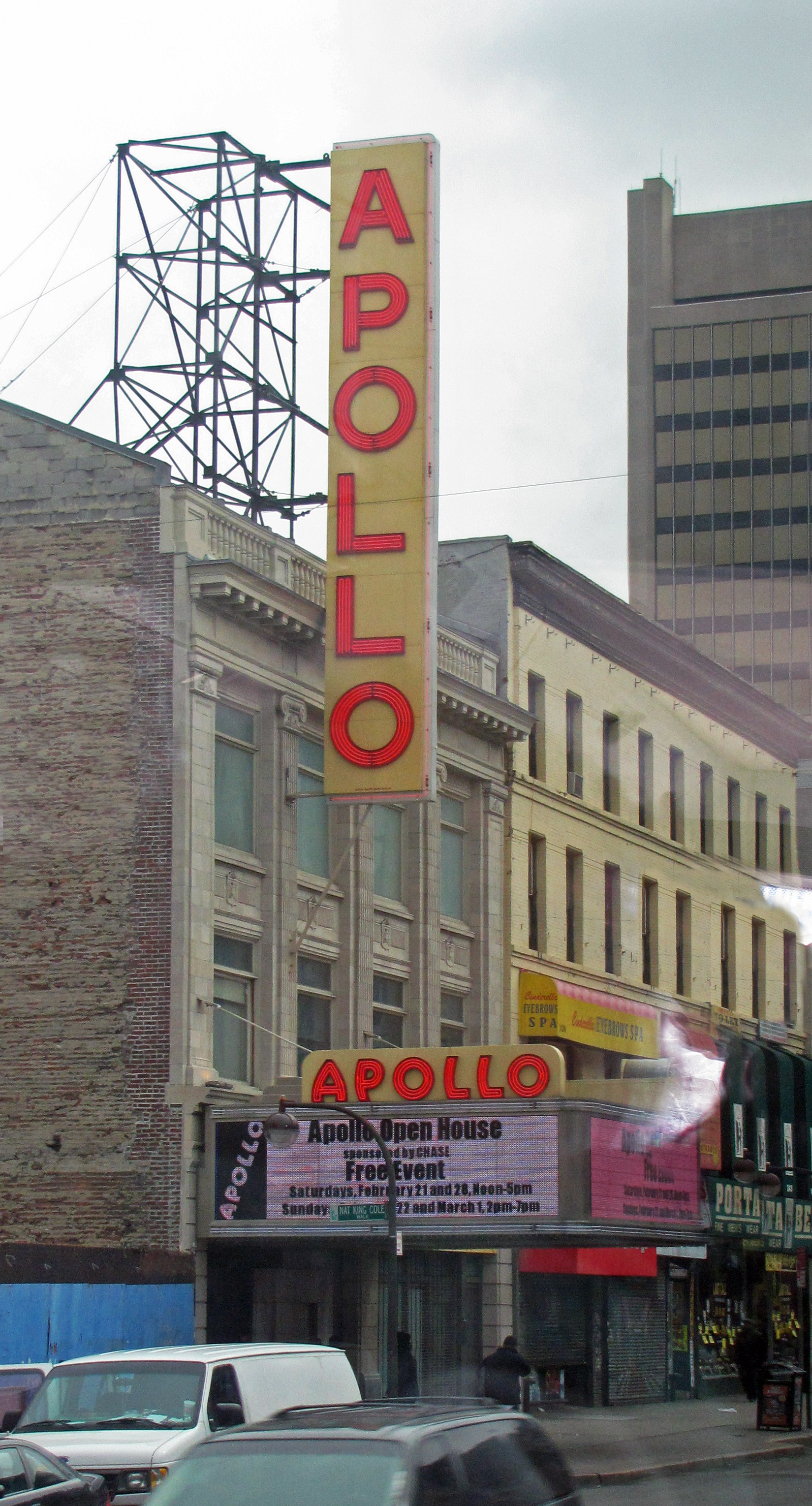
Apollo Theater

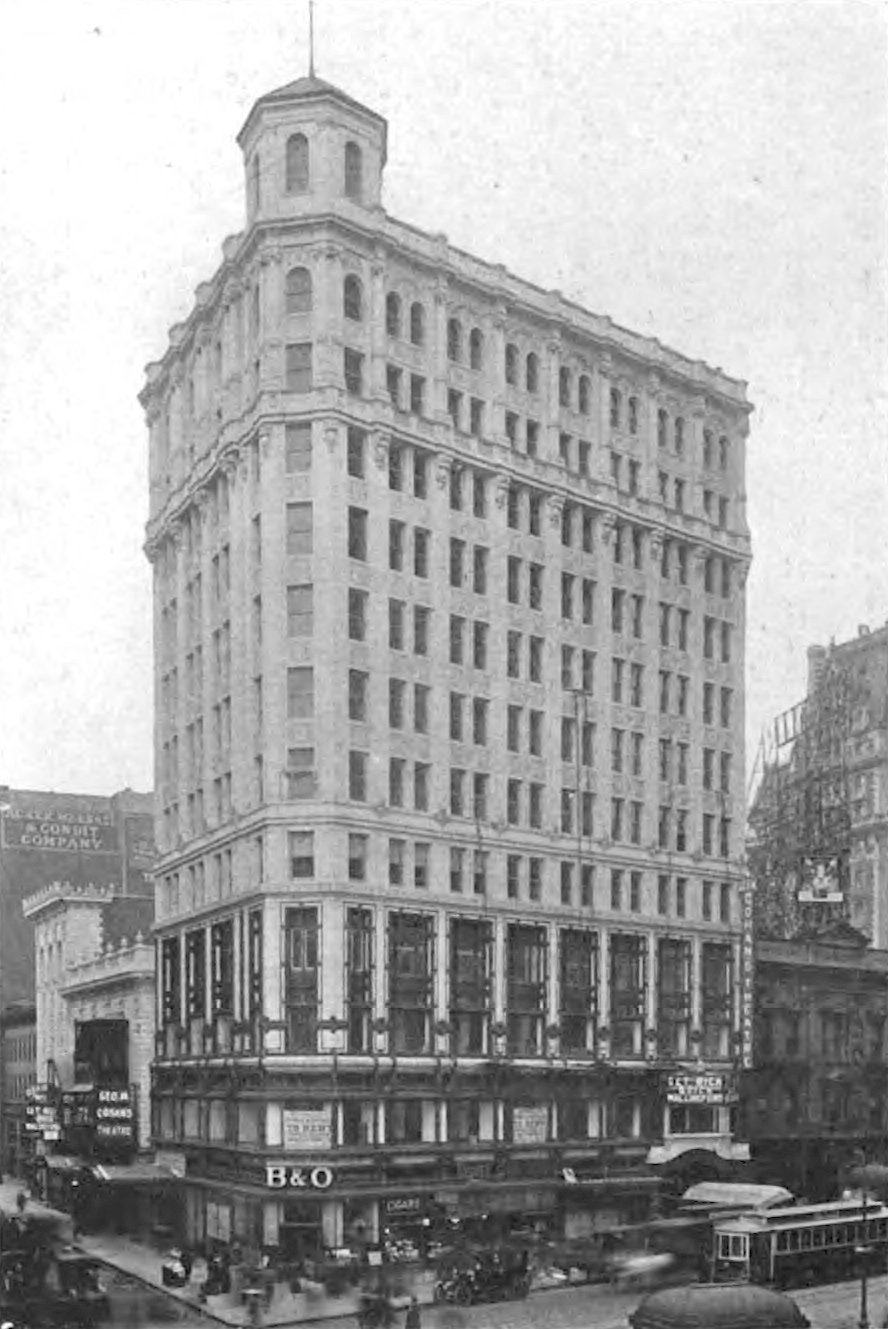
Fitzgerald Building, 1911

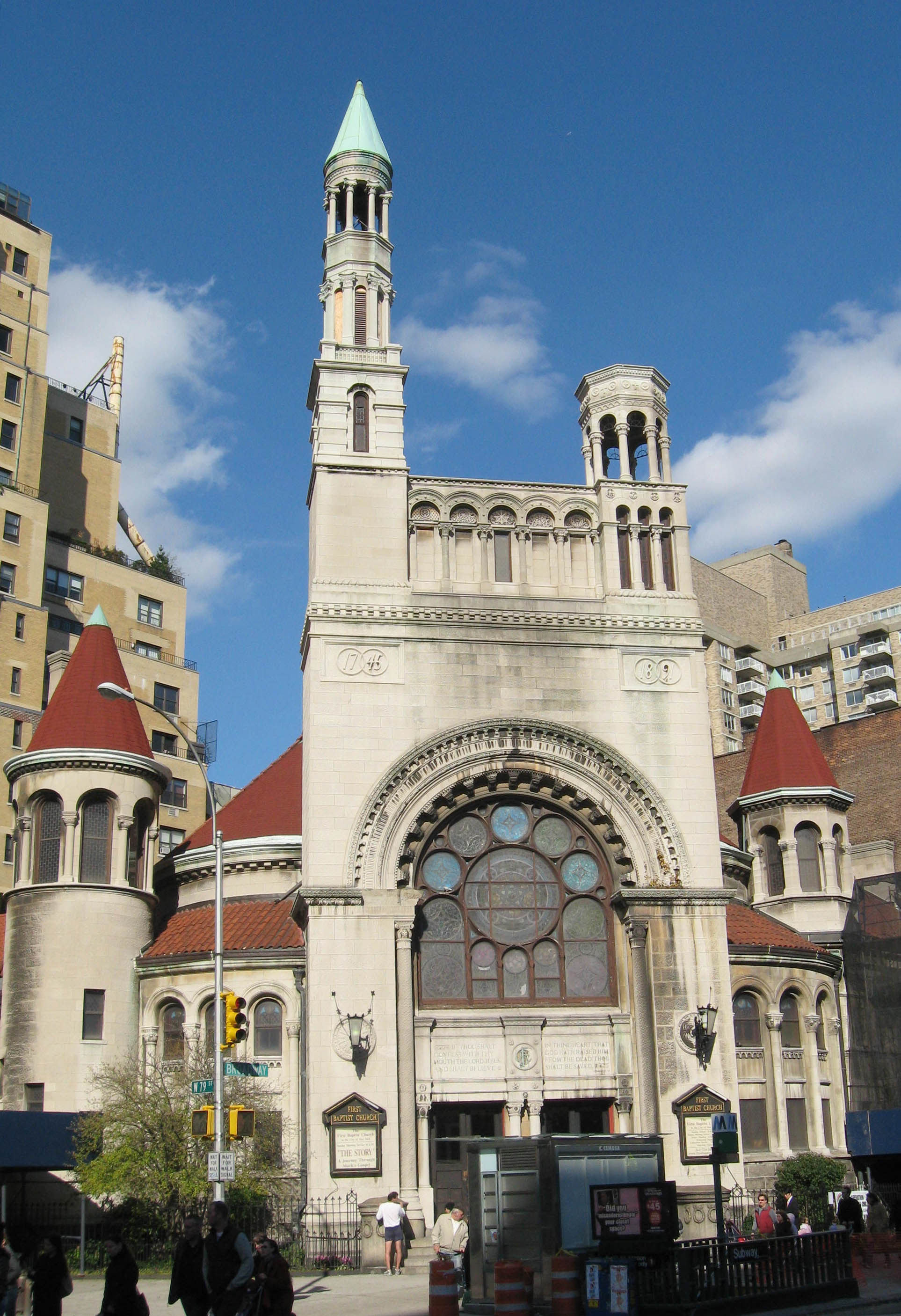
First Baptist Church in the City of New York

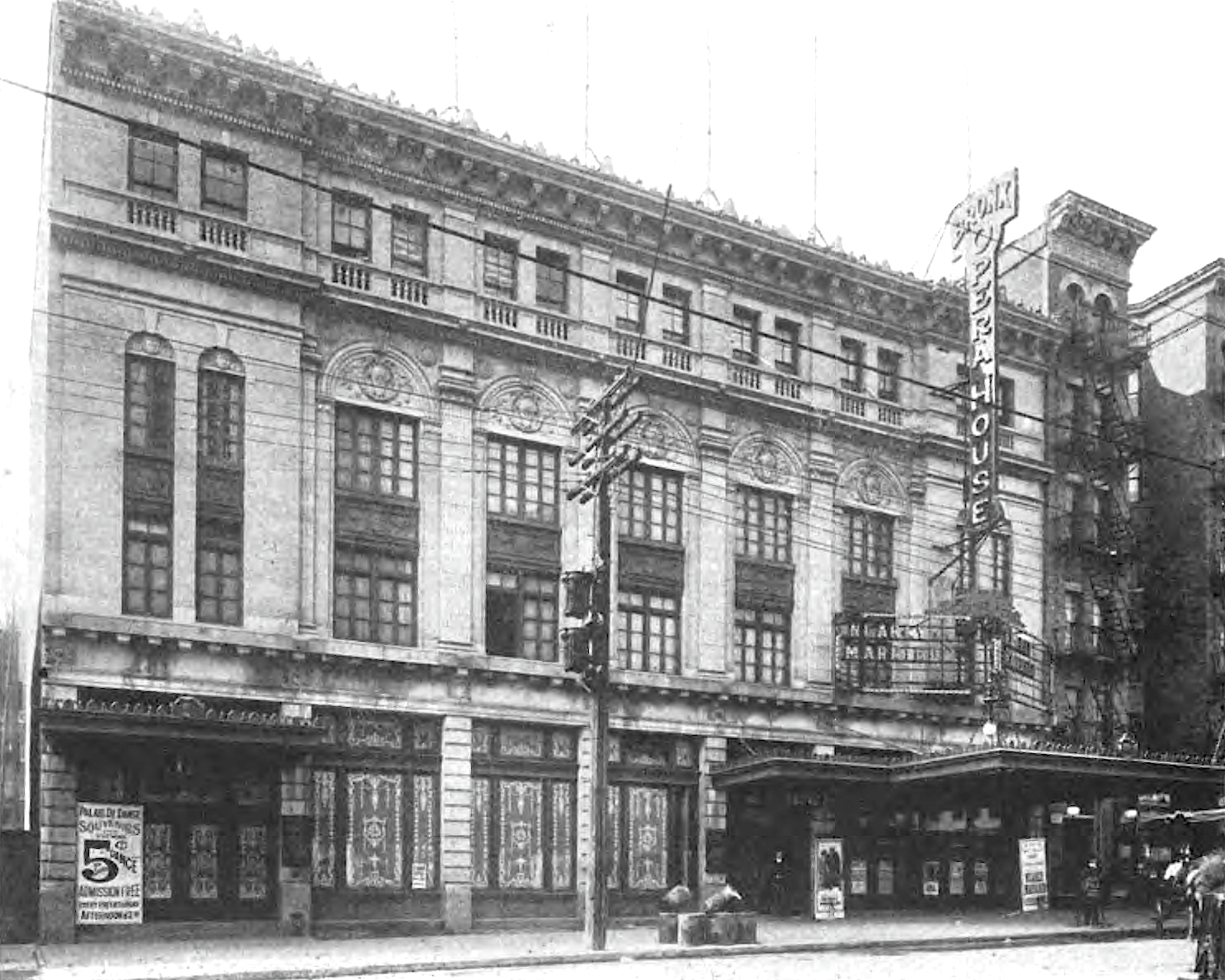
Bronx Opera House, 1913

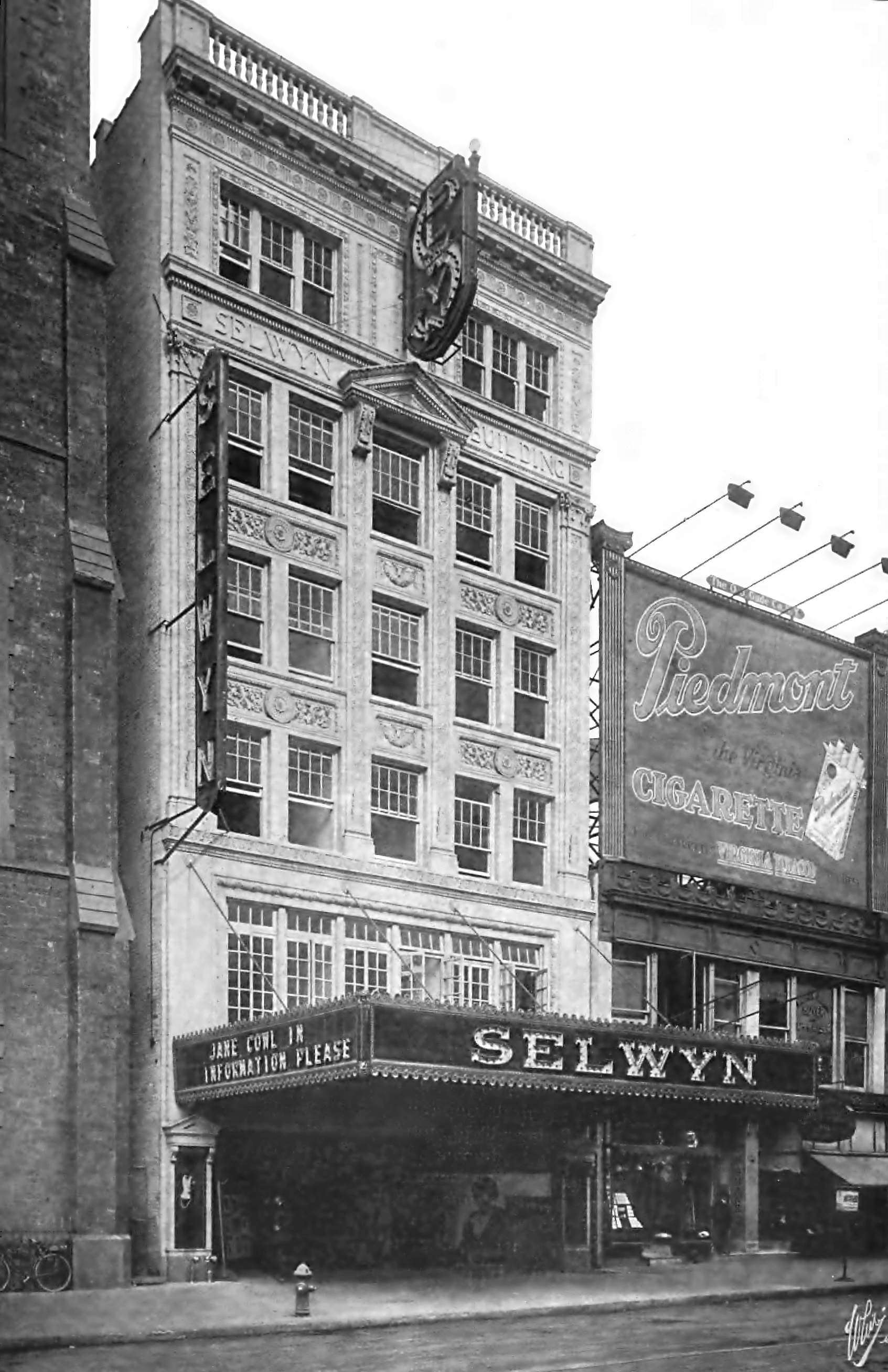
Selwyn Theatre, 1918

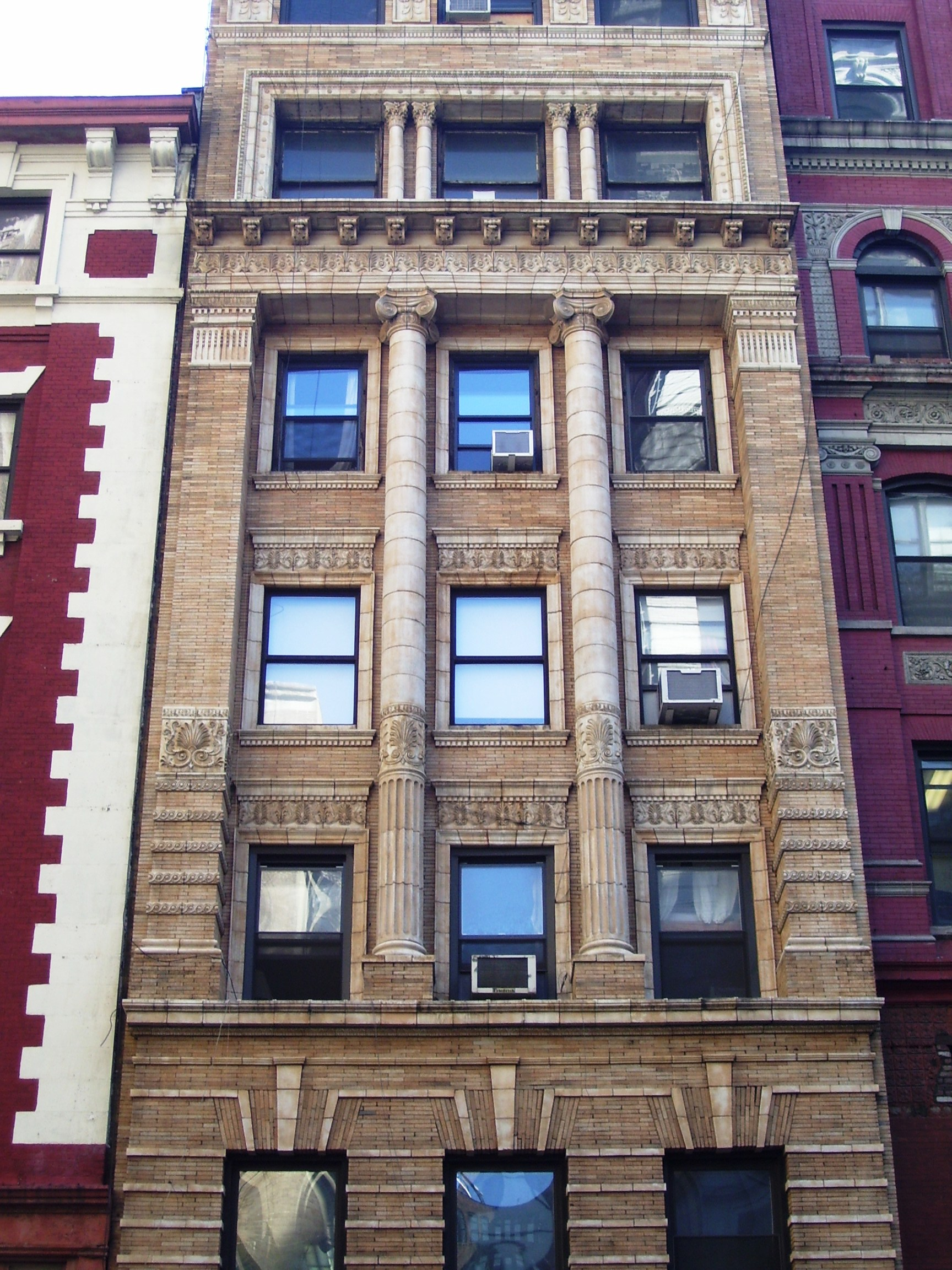
Von Hoffman Building

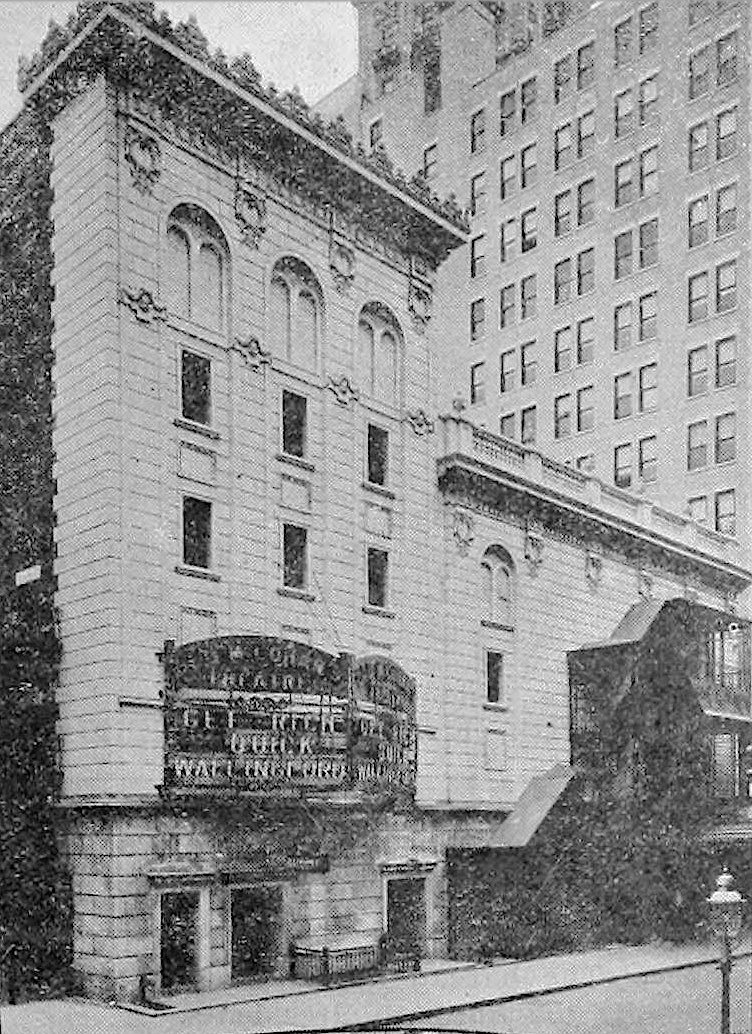
George M. Cohan's Theatre, 1911

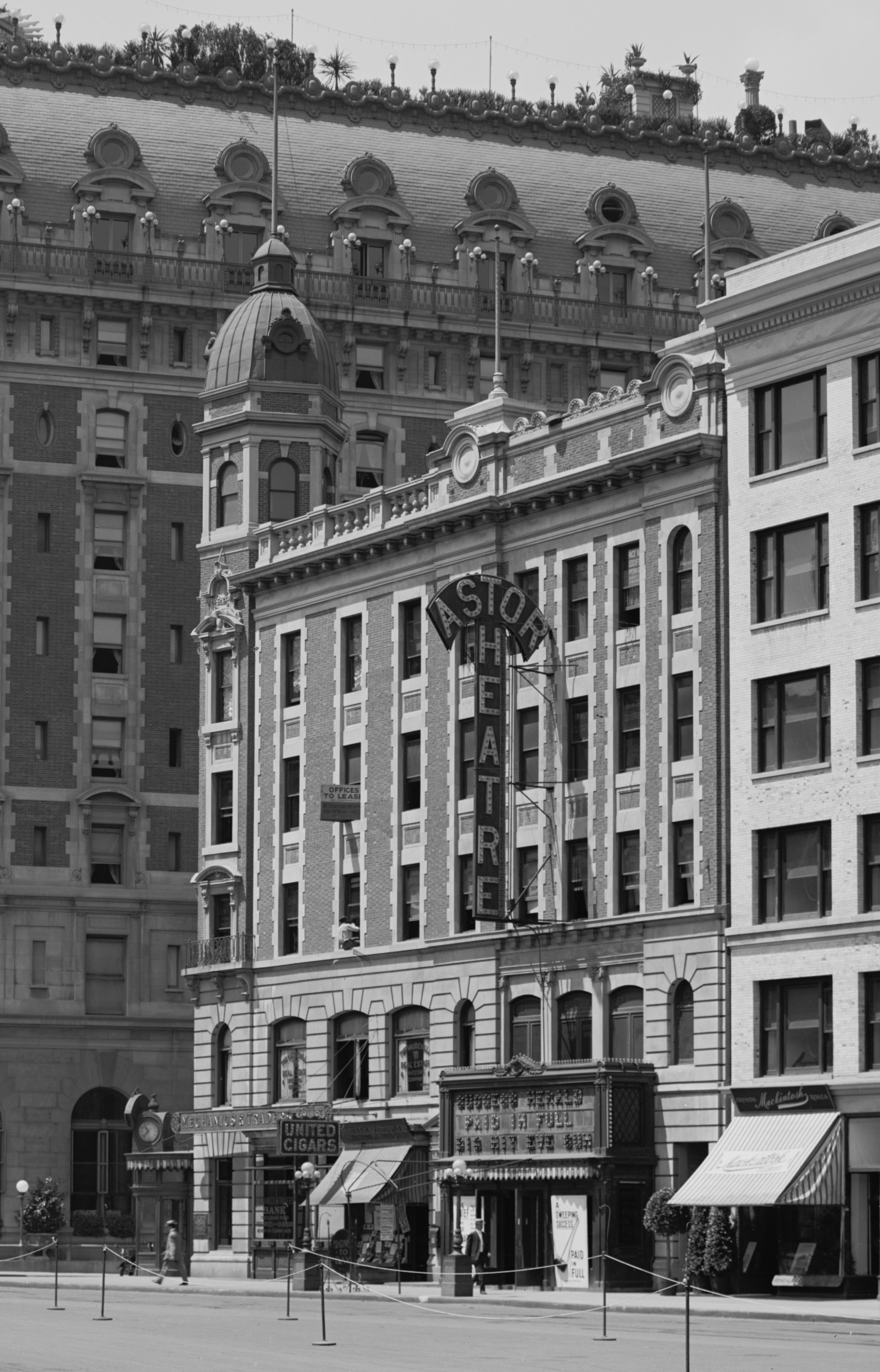
Astor Theatre, 1906

Hotel Gerard was built in 1893 at 123 West 44th Street in Manhattan. It was added to the National Register of Historic Places on February 10, 1983.

The Belasco Theatre is a Broadway theater at 111 West 44th Street in Manhattan, next to the Hotel Gerard. The theatre opened as the Stuyvesant Theatre on October 16, 1907, with the musical A Grand Army Man with Antoinette Perry. Built for impresario David Belasco, the interior featured Tiffany lighting and ceiling panels, rich woodwork and expansive murals by American artist Everett Shinn, and a ten-room duplex penthouse apartment that Belasco utilized as combination living quarters/office space.

The First Baptist Church in the City of New York is at Broadway and 79th Street in Manhattan. A balcony was added in 1903.

The Apollo Theater is at 253 West 125th Street in Manhattan. Opened as Hurtig & Seamon's New Theater, the Apollo was a burlesque house for white patrons.

The Bronx Opera House, planned by Broadway's beloved George M. Cohan, was instantly a hit in the early 1900s. The most famous performers of the time entertained mass audiences in the bustling neighborhood of the artsy South Bronx. Performances from Harry Houdini, the Marx Brothers, David Warfield, George Burns, Eddie Cantor, John Barrymore, and Lionel Barrymore attracted New York's top theatre aficionados. The Opera House manager, George M. Cohan, was so successful in his career that the famous Hammerstein actually donated and erected a statue of him in Times Square, New York, where it stands today. The original facade has been preserved and remains standing in the same place it was 100 years ago.

The Selwyn Theatre at 227 West 42nd Street was a Broadway theatre designed and decorated in an Italian Renaissance style. Built in 1918 by the Selwyn brothers, Edgar and Archie, it was used for musicals and other dramatic performances. One of three theatres they built and controlled on 42nd Street, along with the Apollo and the Times Square Theatre, it originally had 1,180 seats. At the time of its opening, the design had several innovations, the most novel being separate smoking rooms for men and women. Additionally, each dressing room was equipped with a shower and telephone. Eventually it was converted to cinema before closing. It was used briefly as a visitor center but stood vacant for years until a 1997 renovation and restoration.

The Von Hoffman Building is at 29 West 26th Street in Manhattan. It was built in 1893–94 and was designed by George Keister in the Renaissance Revival style. It was originally a hotel and boarding house and was later converted into commercial lofts. It is located within the Madison Square North Historic District.
