= Hotel Gerard =

Hotel in Manhattan, New York

- U.S. National Register of Historic Places
- New York State Register of Historic Places
- New York City Landmark
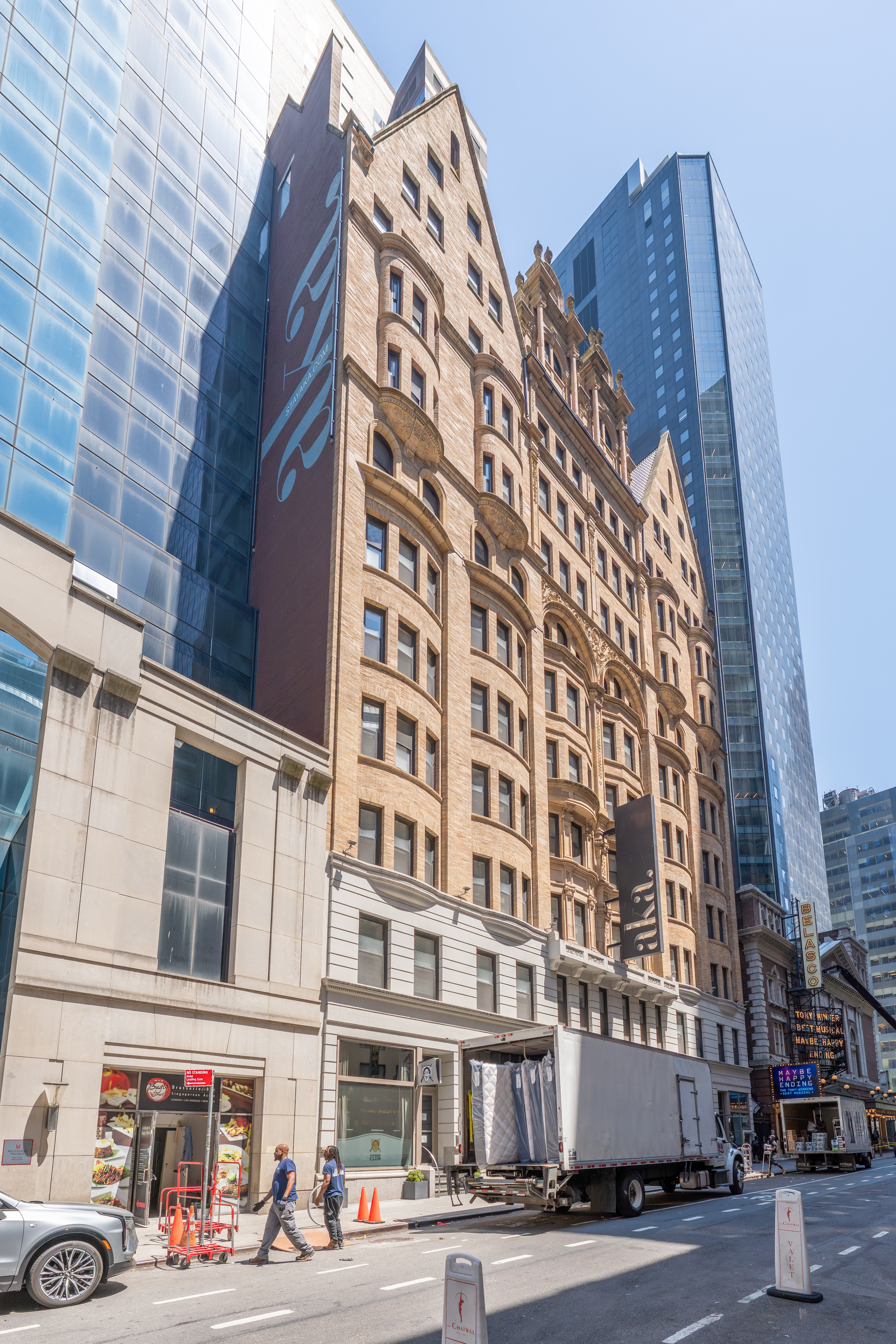
- Hotel Gerard in 2026
- Location: 123 West 44th Street, New York, New York
- Coordinates: 40°45′24.2″N 73°59′2.9″W
- Area: less than one acre
- Built: 1893
- Architect: George Keister
- Architectural style: Renaissance
- NRHP reference No.: 83001729
- NYSRHP No.: 06101.001702
- NYCL No.: 1242

Significant dates
- Added to NRHP: February 10, 1983
- Designated NYSRHP: January 4, 1983
- Designated NYCL: July 27, 1982

The Hotel Gerard, currently known as aka Times Square, is a historic hotel located in New York, New York. It had also operated at the Hotel Langwell and Hotel 1-2-3. The building was designed by George Keister and built in 1893. It is a 13-story, U-shaped, salmon colored brick and limestone building with German Renaissance style design elements. The front facade features bowed pairs of bay windows from the third to the sixth floor and the building is topped by steeply pointed front gables and a highly decorated dormer. It was originally built as an apartment hotel.

The hotel is located at 123 West 44th Street, next door to the Belasco Theatre.

It was added to the National Register of Historic Places on February 10, 1983.

== See also ==
- National Register of Historic Places listings in Manhattan from 14th to 59th Streets
- List of New York City Designated Landmarks in Manhattan from 14th to 59th Streets
