= Subway Circuit =

Group of legitimate New York City theaters

Subway Circuit is a term that was created before 1914 to define a group of legitimate New York City theaters featuring shows passing out from Broadway and usually prefacing their "going on tour" or used to get a try-out of a show before being sent to Broadway for a verdict. The theater also had to be reachable by New York City Subway.

== History ==
Unlike vaudeville managers, who cut salaries of actors when they took the "small time", or entered houses of lesser importance, there were no cuts made in the salaries of the legitimate actors playing the "Subway Circuit". To the actors, four weeks of some subway before or after going on the road was a boon, for the theaters were all within 30 minutes of Broadway and after a performance, they were within easy reach of the theatrical clubs in the theater district.

== Theaters ==
The number of theaters part of the Subway Circuit has changed over time. This is a non-exhaustive list.

=== 1918 ===
- the Montauk Theatre in Brooklyn
- the Teller's Shubert Theatre in Brooklyn
- the Shubert Majestic Theatre in Brooklyn
- the Bronx Opera House
- the Loew's Seventh Avenue Theater
- the Standard Theatre

=== 1921 ===
- the Montauk Theatre in Brooklyn
- the Teller's Shubert Theatre in Brooklyn
- the Shubert Majestic Theatre in Brooklyn
- the Bronx Opera House
- the Shubert Crescent in Brooklyn
- the Riviera Theatre at Broadway and 97th Street

=== 1923 ===
- the Montauk Theatre in Brooklyn
- the Teller's Shubert Theatre in Brooklyn
- the Shubert Majestic Theatre in Brooklyn
- the Bronx Opera House
- the Broad Street Theatre in Newark
- the Riviera Theatre at Broadway and 97th Street
