= Gipsy Love =

Gipsy Love may refer to

- Gipsy Love (operetta), 1910/1911, with music by Franz Lehár
- Gipsy Love, a song by Round 13
