= Kathryn Osterman =

American comic vaudeville actress (1883–1956)

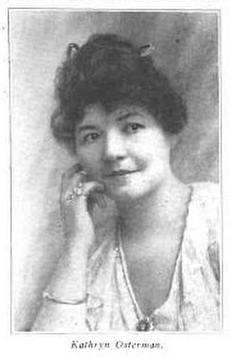
Kathryn Osterman, from a 1915 publication.

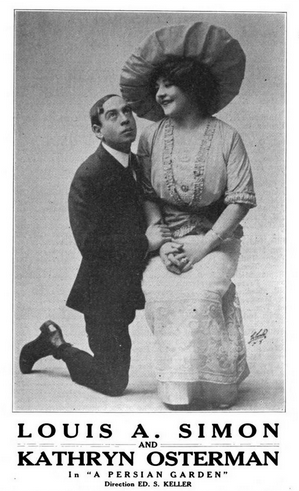
Louis A. Simon and Kathryn Osterman in "A Persian Garden", from a 1912 publication.

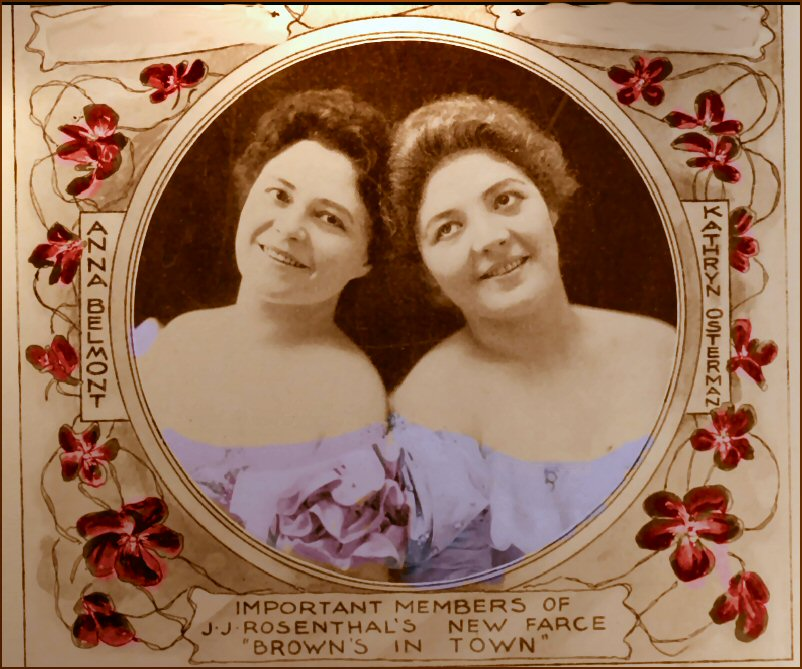
Anna Belmont and her sister, Kathryn Osterman, in J. J. Rosenthal's Brown's in Town (1899)

Kathryn Osterman (May 5, 1883 – August 29, 1956) was an American comic vaudeville actress on stage and in silent films.

== Early life ==
Kathryn Osterman was born in Toledo, Ohio, one of the six daughters of M. D. Osterman and Margarete O'Connor Osterman. Several of her sisters were also actresses, including Lillian Osterman and Anna Belmont.

== Career ==
=== Stage ===
In a 1915 article for Green Book magazine, Osterman wrote, "I have been on the stage for years and years – so long I won't tell about it – and every succeeding season has opened up new and wonderful realms of knowledge to me, and has taught me how little I knew before." Her stage appearances, mostly in touring companies, included roles in The Girl in the Taxi, What Happened to Jones (1897), Miss Petticoats (1903), Piff, Paff, Pouf (1905), The Girl Who Looks Like Me (1907), The Night of the Play (1908–1909), and Modest Suzanne (1912). She also appeared in vaudeville.

=== Screen ===
She appeared in short silent films, including at least fourteen for the American Mutoscope and Biograph Co.: The Art of Making Up (1900), Strictly Fresh Eggs (1901), The Unfaithful Wife (1903) Making a Welsh Rabbit (1903), A Search for Evidence (1903), The Widow (1903), The Rose (1903), The Girl at the Window (1903), Lucky Kitten (1903), Chicks to Order (1903), In My Lady's Boudoir (1903), He Loves Me, He Loves Me Not (1903), Sweets for the Sweet (1903), and The Lost Child (1904). In 1915 she joined the World Comedy Stars Film Corporation to make silent comedy short films, including Housekeeping Under Cover, and The Bludgeon (1915).

=== Legal issues ===
In 1901, Osterman sued a tobacco company for using her likeness in a print advertisement, without permission. In 1903, actress Josephine Victor sued Osterman and her husband over a casting dispute.

== Personal life ==
Kathryn Osterman married theatrical manager Jacob J. Rosenthal in 1898. Their son Jack Osterman (1902–1939) was an actor. She also helped to raise her granddaughter, Kathryn Jacqueline Osterman. She was widowed in 1923, and lost her only son to pneumonia in 1939; she died in 1956, in New York City, aged 73 years.
