= Smith College commencement controversies =

Issues due to choice of graduation speaker

Commencement controversy at Smith College in Northampton, Massachusetts has often been the result of the selection of the commencement speaker. The earliest recorded controversy occurred in 1967. The most recently one occurred in 2025, following Evelyn M. Harris' speech which had been plagiarized from a commencement address given by Toni Morrison at Wellesley College in 2004.

== 1967, Nicholas Katzenbach ==
In 1967, the then-president Thomas C. Mendenhall invited Nicholas Katzenbach to be the commencement speaker for the graduating class. At the time, he was the 24th Undersecretary of State under Lyndon Johnson. When it was announced that he was to give the commencement speech, he was roundly criticized for his stance on the Vietnam War. The senior class petitioned, stating: "We are honored by the presence of Nicholas B. Katzenbach as our commencement speaker. We respect and admire his past work in the fields of civil rights and crime prevention. However, in his post as Under Secretary of State, he is clearly a representative of America's present foreign policy. Therefore, we the undersigned graduating seniors of Smith College take this opportunity to express our opposition to our government’s responsibility for widening the conflict in Vietnam." At their own commencement, members of the graduating class wore white armbands to express their disagreement with the foreign policy of the United States.

Many faculty members also made their opposition to the Vietnam War clear by providing every commencement pamphlet with a petition: "Our hopes are that the U.S. Government, by means of an extraordinary conciliatory gesture, will seek a way of bringing peace to our country and to the world." Nicholas Katzenbach delivered the speech on June 4, 1967, titled, How Can You Be So Sure? amid all parents, faculty, staff, and students. After his speech, President Mendenhall held a conference where Katzenbach expressed the policies of the U.S. in regard to the Vietnam War more specifically. The Alumnae Quarterly of the Summer of 1967 reflected on both methods of protest as "dignified" and hailed the president for handling the situation so well.

== 1970, Dr. Alan F. Guttmacher ==
While there was not as much controversy in 1970 over the choice of Alan Frank Guttmacher, the president of Planned Parenthood, the backlash from parents and alumnae represent their powerful force in an institution that no longer represents them directly. 1970 was also the year that President Richard Nixon's daughter graduated from Smith College. He could not attend the event because his policies were not widely accepted and to avoid the possibility of protests at what was a considered a non-political event. Many parents and alumnae wrote to the president, Thomas Mendenhall, declaring their dissatisfaction with the commencement speaker choice and lamenting how neither the President of The United States, nor his daughter, could be present at her own graduation. In a letter to the editor of the Daily Hampshire Gazette, the author stated: "If the present Administration and Trustees feel [they] cannot handle the troublemakers on Campus, then quietly resign and I'm sure you will have some others who will be quite capable of handling the situations as they arise and will not cop-out." Many were upset that the president of Planned Parenthood, an organization that they say promoted pre-marital sex, could speak in front of the Smith community while the President of The United States "could not" attend.

Dr. Alan F. Guttmacher delivered his address Fertility Control: A Gift and Challenge on graduation day.

== 1983, Jeane Kirkpatrick ==
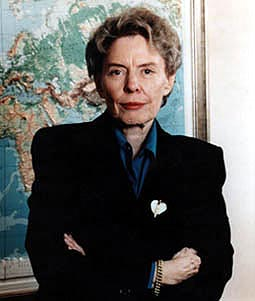
Official portrait of Jeane Kirkpatrick

One of the most notable controversies of Smith College’s history of commencement was president Jill Ker Conway's and the trustees’ decision to host Jeane Kirkpatrick as the class of 1983′s speaker. After she served as a foreign policy adviser to Ronald Reagan, she was the first female U.S. ambassador to the United Nations and was known for her doctrine, The Kirkpatrick Doctrine which justified U.S. support of military dictatorships in Central and South America. Almost immediately after the announcement of their choice, students organized against it, claiming that a human rights abuser should not receive an honorary degree. A letter to the Alumnae Quarterly by Helen Haddad ’63 said: "Students began writing letters and ‘perspectives’ pieces to The Sophian, both in support of, and in opposition to, Mrs. Kirkpatrick—among them was a piece written by a senior whose aunt was one of the four Maryknoll nuns killed in El Salvador. They discussed their interpretations of Mrs. Kirkpatrick’s published books and articles. They discussed American foreign policy in Latin America, South Africa, and elsewhere. Some students who in October knew very little about Mrs. Kirkpatrick, except perhaps that she was an ambassador to the United Nations, were now arguing over her views and votes, whether she was an appropriate commencement speaker, and whether they approved of the award of an honorary degree"

== 2014, Christine Lagarde ==
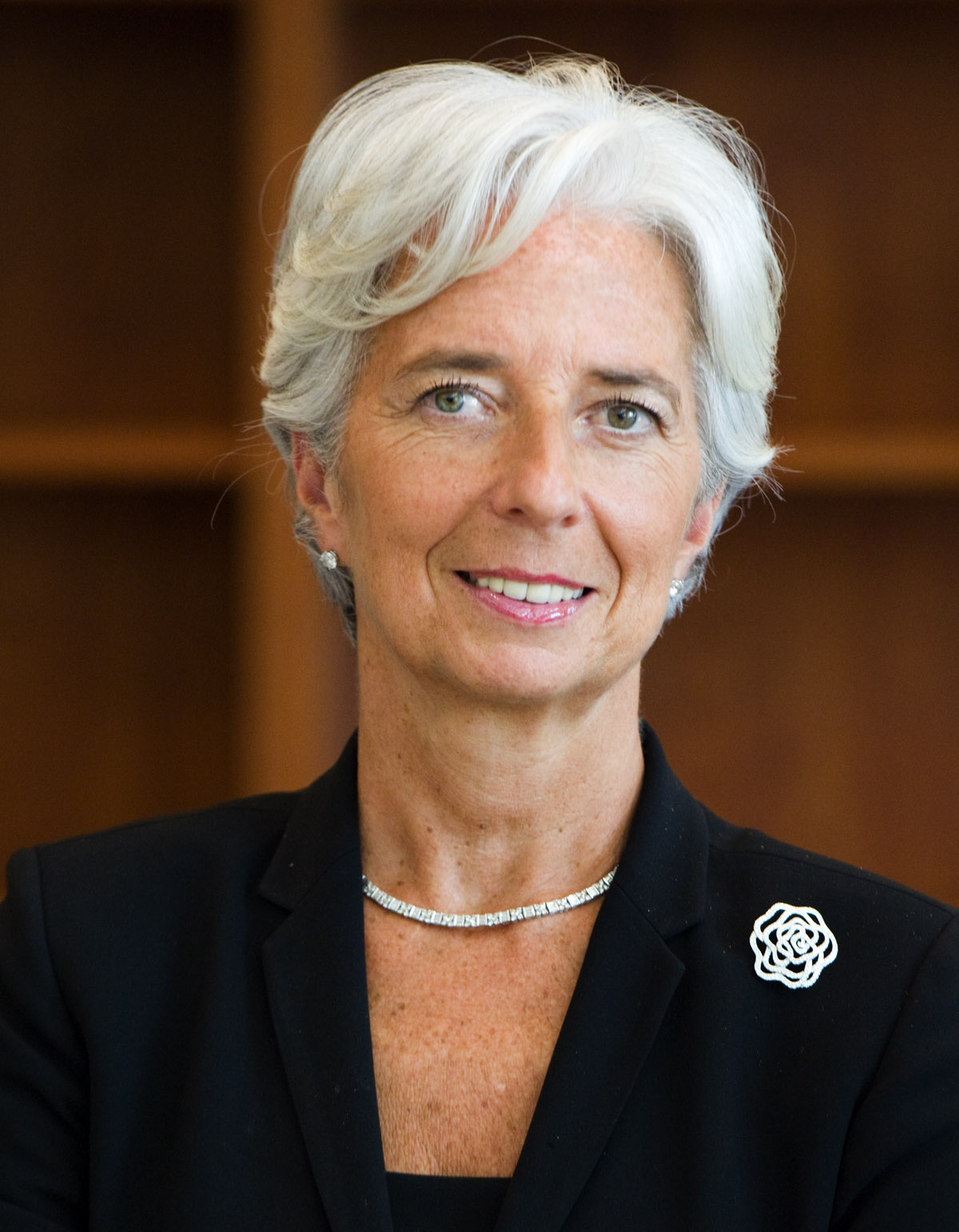
Portrait of Christine Lagarde

The invitation extended in 2014 to Christine Lagarde, the first female Managing Director of the International Monetary Fund, sparked protests, petitions, and discussions. The contested question was whether Christine Lagarde benefited the world with her high-status position.

In the wake of the protests, Lagarde rescinded her acceptance to speak at Smith College’s commencement ceremony. The response to her withdrawal was immense. Numerous articles appeared in major media outlets. Many alumnae wrote to the President, Kathleen McCartney, and faculty petitioned against those who had petitioned in support of McCartney and the Trustees. Students who had organized against the choice of having her speak wrote an open letter to McCartney after she emailed the entire College, stating: "I want to underscore this fact: An invitation to speak at a commencement is not an endorsement of all views or policies of an individual or the institution she or he leads. Such a test would preclude virtually anyone in public office or position of influence. Moreover, such a test would seem anathema to our core values of free thought and diversity of opinion. I remain committed to leading a college where differing views can be heard and debated with respect."

== 2022, Luma Mufleh ==
Luma Mufleh, Smith College alumna (class of 1997) and founder and director of Fugees Family, Inc., a non-profit organization devoted to working with child survivors of war, was removed from the role of commencement speaker following an independent investigation.

Beverly Daniel Tatum, president emerita of Spelman College and trustee emerita of Smith College was chosen to deliver the commencement address in her stead.

== 2025, Evelyn M. Harris ==
Former member of a capella group Sweet Honey in the Rock Evelyn M. Harris was invited as one of four commencement speakers presenting at the 2025 commencement ceremony. However, students noticed many similarities to Toni Morrison's 2004 commencement address to Wellesley College, and shared their concerns on student social media platforms. Smith College President Sarah Willie Le-Breton addressed the incident in an email sent out to the college community the next day, stating that Harris "borrowed much of her speech to graduates and their families from the commencement speeches of others without the attribution typical of and central to the ideals of academic integrity." She stated that Harris was "forthcoming about her choices while also acknowledging that she sought to infuse the words of others with her own emotional valence," and confirmed that Harris returned her honorary degree.
