= Wimin =

Wimin may refer to:

- Womyn, an alternate spelling of the word 'women', sometimes used by feminists.
- WIMIN, the Women in Mathematics in New England conference, hosted by the Center for Women in Mathematics
