= Center for Women in Mathematics =

American educational program

The Center for Women in Mathematics, a part of the Smith College Department of Mathematics and Statistics, is an American educational program founded in 2007 to increase the involvement of women in mathematics. The Center aims for students to engage in coursework and research in a mathematical environment that actively supports women.

== Junior Program ==
The Junior Program is designed for undergraduate women who wish to spend a year or a semester studying mathematics at a women's college. Financial aid funding is provided by the National Science Foundation.

== Post-Baccalaureate Program ==
The Post-Baccalaureate Program is geared towards women with bachelor's degrees who didn't major in mathematics as undergraduates or whose major was light. The post-baccalaureate program is funded through grants from Smith College and the National Science Foundation and students receive tuition waivers and living stipends.

Students of both programs are able to take classes not only at Smith College, but also at any other of the Five Colleges - Amherst, Mt. Holyoke and Hampshire Colleges and UMass Amherst, the last of which also offers graduate-level courses.

== WIMIN Conference ==
Each year the Center hosts the Women in Mathematics in New England (WIMIN) Conference. The conference features two plenary lectures given by prominent female mathematicians: the Dorothy Wrinch Lecture in Biomathematics, and the Alice Dickinson Lecture in Mathematics. It also features short talks by undergraduate and graduate students (of any gender), and a panel intended for students considering graduate studies.

=== Past Plenary Speakers ===
Year	Dorothy Wrinch lecturer	Alice Dickinson lecturer
2022	Julie Blackwood, Williams College	Laura DeMarco, Harvard University
2021	Andrea Foulkes, Massachusetts General Hospital and Harvard Medical School	Rosa Orellana, Dartmouth College
2020	Nora Youngs, Colby College	Emille Davie Lawrence, University of San Francisco
2019	Erica Graham, Bryn Mawr College	Allison Henrich, Seattle University
2018	Shelby Wilson, Morehouse College	Zajj Daugherty, City University of New York
2017	Elizabeth Stuart, Johns Hopkins University	Ina Petkova, Dartmouth College
2016	Adriana Dawes, Ohio State University	Pamela Harris, Williams College
2015	Mariel Vazquez, University of California at Davis	Linda Chen, Swarthmore College
2014	Erika Camacho, Arizona State University	Ami Radunskaya, Pomona College
2013	Trachette Jackson, University of Michigan	Susan Loepp, Williams College
2012	Christine Heitsch, Georgia Institute of Technology	Annalisa Crannell, Franklin and Marshall College
2011	Carolyn Gordon, Dartmouth College	Liz McMahon, Lafayette College
2010	Jill Pipher, Brown University	Julianna Tymoczko, University of Iowa
2009	Anna Lysyanskaya, Brown University	Mia Minnes, Massachusetts Institute of Technology
2008	Ruth Charney, Brandeis University	

== Sources ==
- Center for Women in Mathematics Brochure
