= Death of Frances Smith =

American college student who disappeared in 1928

Frances Smith
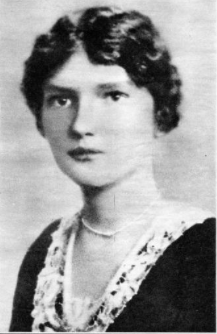
- Born: Frances St. John Smith; 1909/1910; New York City, U.S.
- Disappeared: January 13, 1928 (age 18); Northampton, Massachusetts, U.S.
- Status: Body recovered March 29, 1929
- Resting place: Wildwood Cemetery, Amherst, Massachusetts, U.S.
- Parents: St. John Smith (father); Florence Smith (mother)

Frances St. John Smith (1909/1910 – disappeared January 13, 1928) was an American college student who disappeared from Smith College in Massachusetts in January 1928. A body recovered from the Connecticut River in March 1929 was identified as being Smith.

== Disappearance ==
Smith was first educated in New York City, then attended Milton Academy in Milton, Massachusetts, from 1924 through 1927. She then enrolled at Smith College in Northampton, Massachusetts. One of her classmates and friends there was Anne Morrow, who later married Charles Lindbergh.

Smith was an 18-year-old freshman when she disappeared from Smith College on January 13, 1928, a Friday. Another friend, who had visited with Smith on Thursday evening, visited Smith's room on both Friday and Saturday, leaving notes each time, which were left undisturbed. The local Massachusetts State Police were then contacted.

== Search ==
Initial searches were conducted in the area around the college by the state police and Boy Scouts. On Sunday afternoon, a local attorney and his wife, driving near Deerfield, Massachusetts, briefly spoke with a young woman walking toward Greenfield. While it was suspected this may have been Smith, the young woman could not be found by police.

A garbled telegraph message received from an Annie Smith who had arrived in Paris led to a false report that Frances Smith was at a hotel there, but this was soon discredited. Further searching extended to a convent near Quebec City in Canada, based on a report from a railroad conductor who thought a passenger on his train might have been Smith. Paradise Pond, adjacent to the Smith College campus in Northampton, was drained in late March 1928, but nothing of significance was found.

Smith's parents initially offered a reward of $1,000 (equivalent to $18,750 in 2025) for their daughter's return, and later increased it to $10,000 (equivalent to $187,500 in 2025).

== Discovery ==
On March 29, 1929, two workmen searching the Connecticut River near Longmeadow, Massachusetts, for a drowned colleague recovered a woman's body. Based on the estimated height and weight and condition of the body, police tentatively identified it as Smith's. Although the discovery was discredited by Smith's parents, a positive identification was made by Smith's dentist, noting a retaining wire between eye teeth of the lower jaw, consistent with Smith's dental work and confirmed by a friend. Smith's dentist also provided some of her dental fittings, which matched the body. The medical examiner determined the cause of death to be drowning by undetermined circumstances.

A funeral for Smith was held on April 1 in South Amherst, Massachusetts, at the Smith family's summer home. Smith was buried in Wildwood Cemetery in Amherst, Massachusetts.

== See also ==
- Disappearance of Alice Corbett, another student who vanished from Smith College, in 1925
- List of solved missing person cases (pre-1950)
- List of unsolved deaths
