= Harris Hawthorne Wilder =

American zoologist and anatomist (1864–1928)

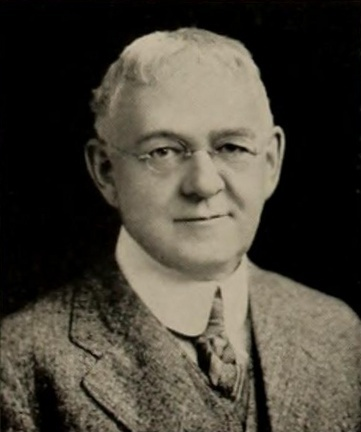
- Wilder, c. 1917, age 52–53
- Born: April 7, 1864; Bangor, Maine, US
- Died: February 27, 1928 (aged 63)
- Resting place: Bridge Street Cemetery, Northampton, Massachusetts, US
- Education: Worcester Classical High School; Amherst College (B.A.); University of Freiburg (Ph.D.)
- Spouse: Inez L. Whipple (m. 1906)
- Scientific career
- Fields: Zoology
- Thesis: A contribution to the anatomy of Siren lacertina (1891)

Harris Hawthorne Wilder (April 7, 1864 – February 27, 1928) was an American zoologist and anatomist. He was professor of zoology at Smith College in Massachusetts for 36 years until his death. He was the first American to study dermatoglyphics, the study of skin ridges and fingerprints, and this along with his studies of facial reconstruction placed him among the pioneers of fingerprint analysis and forensic sciences.

Hawthorne was born in Bangor, Maine, the only child of parents Solon and Sarah Watkins Wilder (née Smith). His father was a musical director, and his mother the daughter of a physician. He attended Amherst College in Massachusetts, graduating with an A.B. in 1886. He then taught high school biology in Chicago for three years before attending the University of Freiburg in Germany. He studied under anatomist Robert Wiedersheim, and earned a Ph.D. in 1891. He joined the Smith College faculty in 1892, where he spent the remainder of his career. On July 26, 1906, he married Inez L. Whipple, a Smith College instructor and former research assistant.

Wilder's published work include seven books and 39 journal articles. He was a member of the American Society of Naturalists, American Society of Zoologists, Association of American Anatomists, American Anthropological Association, American Academy of Arts and Sciences, International Association for Identification, and the Boston Society of Natural History.
