= Smith College =

Women's liberal arts college in Northampton, Massachusetts

- Motto: Ἐν τῇ ἀρετῇ τὴν γνῶσιν (Greek)
- Motto in English: To Virtue, Knowledge (2 Peter 1:5)
- Type: Private liberal arts women's college
- Established: 1871; 155 years ago (opened 1875; 151 years ago)
- Accreditation: NECHE
- Affiliations: NAICU; Five Colleges; Seven Sisters; Annapolis Group; Oberlin Group; CLAC
- Academic affiliations: COFHE; Seven Sisters; Oberlin Group
- Endowment: $2.71 billion (2025)
- President: Sarah Willie-LeBreton
- Provost: Daphne Lamothe
- Students: 2,915 (fall 2025)
- Undergraduates: 2,578 (fall 2025)
- Postgraduates: 337 (fall 2025)
- Location: Northampton, Massachusetts, U.S. 42°19′3″N 72°38′15″W
- Campus: Small-town
- Colors: Blue with gold trim
- Nickname: Smith Bears
- Sporting affiliations: NCAA Division III – NEWMAC
- Website: smith.edu

Smith College is a private liberal arts women's college in Northampton, Massachusetts, United States. It was chartered in 1871 by Sophia Smith and opened in 1875. It is a member of the historic Seven Sisters colleges, a group of women's colleges in the Northeastern United States. Smith is also a member of the Five College Consortium with four other institutions in the Pioneer Valley: Mount Holyoke College, Amherst College, Hampshire College, and the University of Massachusetts Amherst; students of each college are allowed to attend classes at any other member institution. On campus are Smith's Museum of Art and Botanic Garden, the latter designed by Frederick Law Olmsted.

Smith has 50 academic departments and programs and is structured around an open curriculum. Examinations vary from self-scheduled exams, scheduled exams, and take-home exams. Undergraduate admissions are exclusively restricted to women, including transgender women since 2015. Smith offers several graduate degrees, all of which accept applicants regardless of gender, and co-administers programs alongside other Five College Consortium members. The college was the first historically women's college to offer an undergraduate engineering degree. Admissions are considered selective. It was the first women's college to join the NCAA, and its sports teams are known as the Smith Bears.

Smith alumnae include notable authors, journalists, activists, feminists, politicians, investors, philanthropists, actresses, filmmakers, academics, businesswomen, CEOs, two first ladies of the United States, and recipients of the Pulitzer Prize, Rhodes Scholarship, Academy Award, Emmy Award, MacArthur Grant, Peabody Award, and Tony Award.

== History ==
=== Early history ===
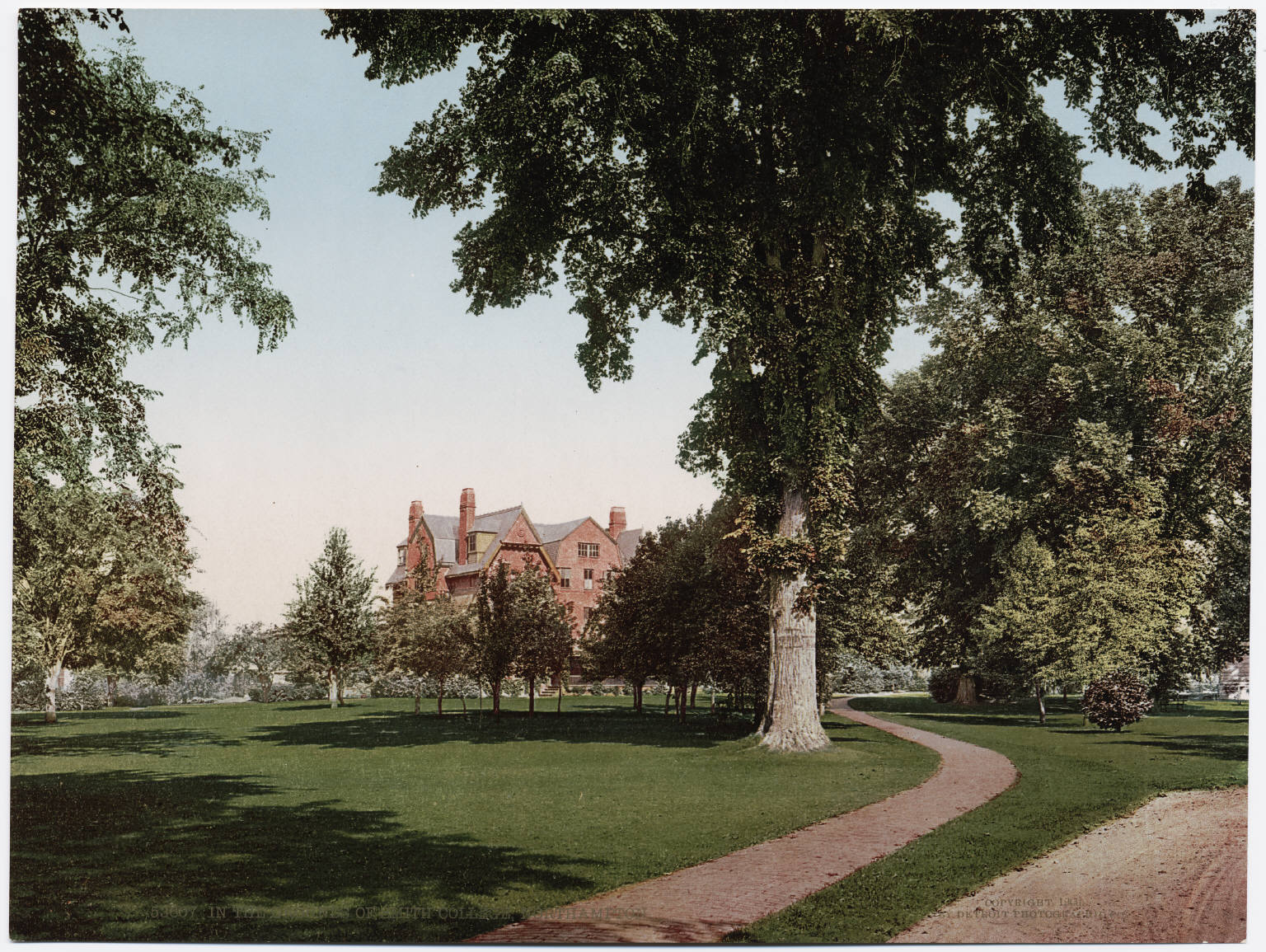
A view of Smith's campus c. 1900

The college was chartered in 1871 by a bequest of Sophia Smith and opened its doors in 1875 with 14 students and 6 faculty. At age 65, when Smith inherited a fortune from her father, she decided that leaving her inheritance to found a women's college was the best way for her to fulfill the moral obligation she expressed in her will:

I hereby make the following provisions for the establishment and maintenance of an Institution for the higher education of young women, with the design to furnish for my own sex means and facilities for education equal to those which are afforded now in our colleges to young men.

The campus was planned and planted in the 1890s as a botanical garden and arboretum, designed by noted American landscape architect, Frederick Law Olmsted. By 1915, the student enrollment was 1,724, and the faculty numbered 163.

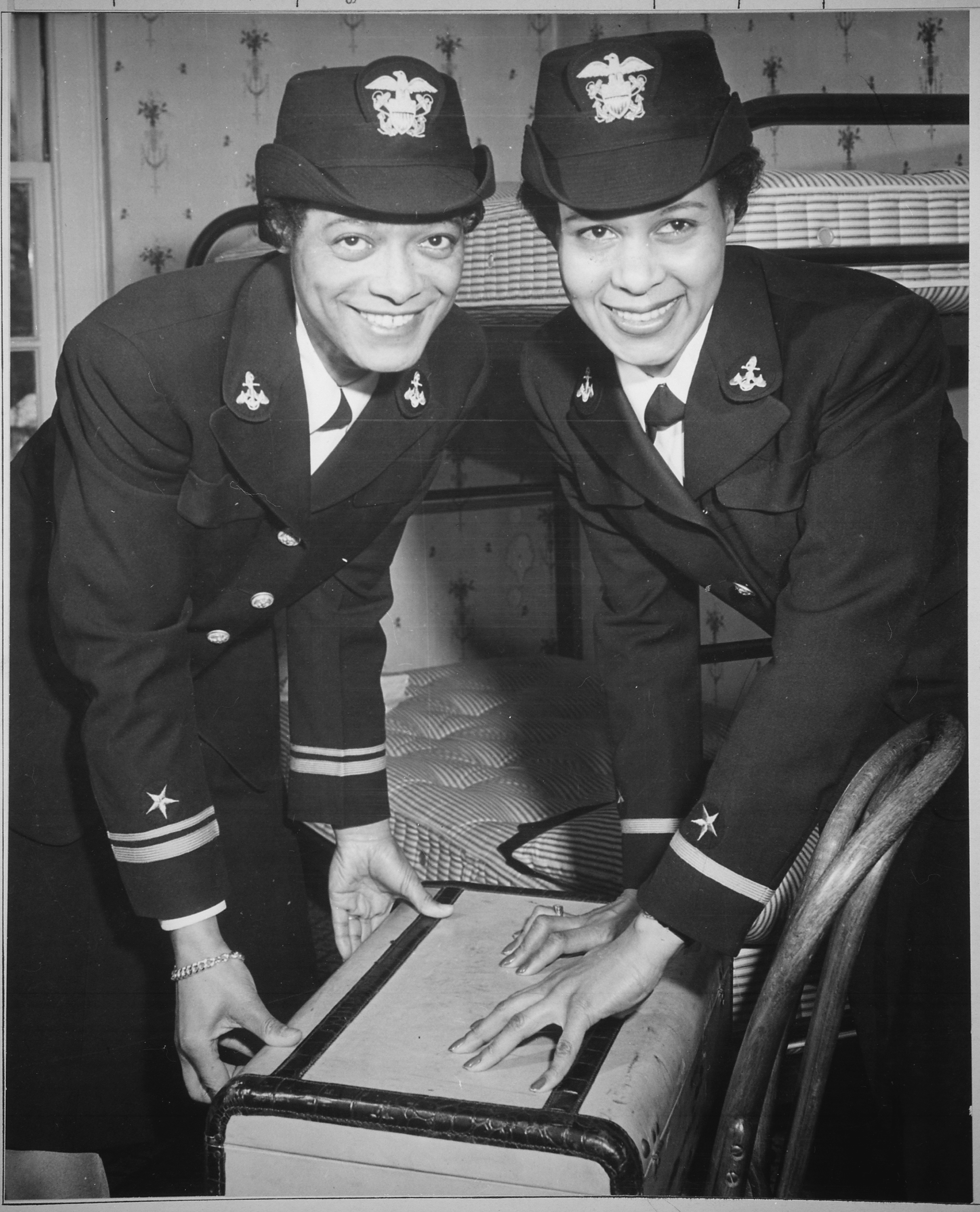
LTJG Harriet Ida Pickens and ENS Frances Wills, first African-American WAVES to be commissioned. They were members of the final graduating class at USNR Midshipmen's School (WR) Northampton, Massachusetts, on December 21, 1944

During the 1920s, two students at the college went missing: junior Alice Corbett disappeared on November 13, 1925, and was never found; freshman Frances Smith disappeared on January 13, 1928—her body was recovered from the Connecticut River months later.

By 2010, the school had 2,600 undergraduates on campus and 250 students studying elsewhere. The campus landscape now encompasses 147 acres (59 ha) and includes more than 1,200 varieties of trees and shrubs. Smith is the largest privately endowed college for women in the United States.

=== United States Naval Reserve Midshipmen's School ===
The United States Naval Reserve Midshipmen's School at Smith College was training grounds for junior officers of the Women's Reserve of the U.S. Naval Reserve (WAVES) and was nicknamed "USS Northampton". On August 28, 1942, a total of 120 women reported to the school for training.

=== 21st century ===
In April 2015, the faculty adopted an open-access policy to make its scholarship publicly accessible online.

On September 15, 2022, the Board of Trustees announced Sarah Willie-LeBreton had been selected as the 12th president of Smith College, effective July 1, 2023.

In June 2025, a conservative watchdog group sued the school for alleged Title IX violations, arguing that the school's policy of admitting transgender women but not transgender men discriminated against people assigned female at birth who changed genders.

In March and April 2026, some 50 Smith College students, led by Students for Justice in Palestine (SJP), were involved in protests that included the unauthorized encampment and occupation of College Hall, the main administrative building on campus, demanding that the college divest its endowment from companies they said were linked to weapons used by Israel in the Gaza conflict. College administrators granted SJP a meeting with the college president in exchange for ending the encampment and later rejected the divestment proposal, citing a lack of mission alignment, societal impact, and community consensus, alongside a negative financial impact concern.

=== Presidents ===
Smith has been led by 11 presidents and two acting presidents. (Elizabeth Cutter Morrow was the first acting president of Smith College and the first female head of the college, but she did not use the title of president.) For the 1975 centennial, the college inaugurated its first woman president, Jill Ker Conway, who came to Smith from Australia by way of Harvard and the University of Toronto. Since President Conway's term, all Smith presidents have been women, with the exception of John M. Connolly's one-year term as acting president in the interim after President Ruth Simmons left to lead Brown University.

No.	Image	President	Term start	Term end	Refs.
1		Laurenus Clark Seelye	1875	1910	
2		Marion LeRoy Burton	1910	1917 (Note: Resigned to head the University of Minnesota.)	
3		William Allan Neilson	1917	August 31, 1939	
acting		Elizabeth Cutter Morrow (Note: First woman to head Smith College.)	September 1, 1939	1940	
4		Herbert Davis	1940	1949	
5		Benjamin Fletcher Wright	1949	June 30, 1959	
6		Thomas Corwin Mendenhall	July 1, 1959	June 30, 1975	
7		Jill Ker Conway (Note: First woman president.)	July 1, 1975	June 30, 1985	
8		Mary Maples Dunn	July 1, 1985	June 30, 1995	
9		Ruth Simmons (Note: Resigned to head Brown University.)	July 1, 1995	June 30, 2001	
acting		John M. Connolly	July 1, 2001	May 31, 2002	
10		Carol T. Christ	June 1, 2002	June 30, 2013	
11		Kathleen McCartney	July 1, 2013	June 30, 2023	
12		Sarah Willie-LeBreton	July 1, 2023	Present	

Table notes:

== Campus ==
=== Environmental sustainability ===
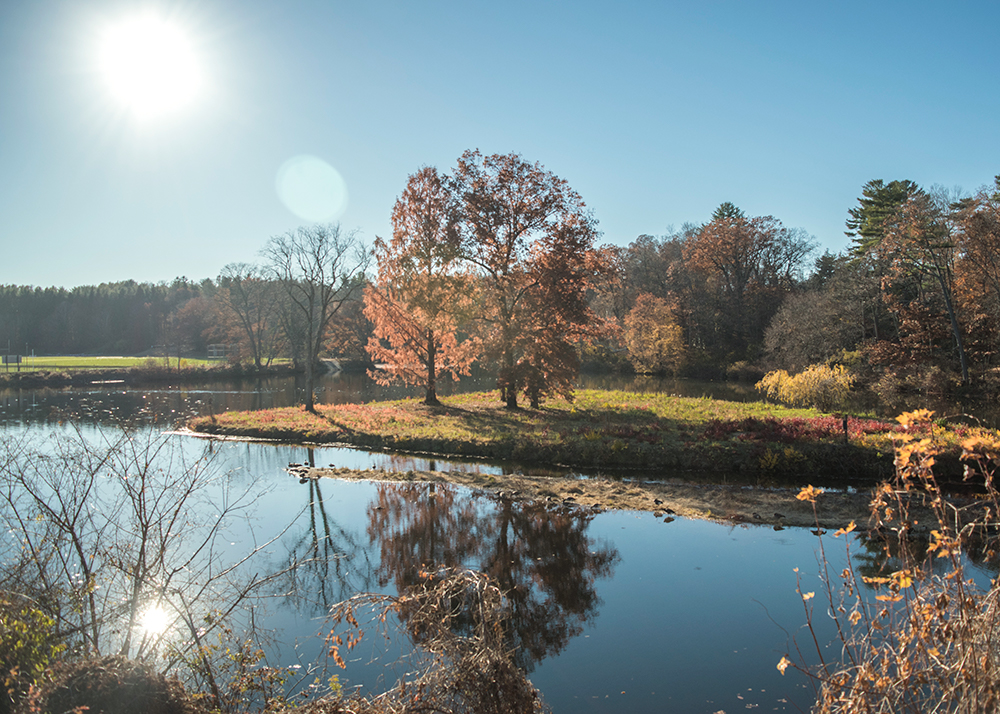
Paradise Pond with portion of athletic fields visible (center left)

Smith has a contract with Zipcar in efforts to reduce individually owned cars on campus. The college has also promoted sustainability through academics and through the arts.

For Smith's efforts regarding sustainability, the institution earned a grade of A− on the "College Sustainability Report Card 2010" administered by the Sustainable Endowments Institute. Smith was lauded for many of the indicator categories, including student involvement, green building, and transportation, but was marked down for endowment transparency.

=== Architecture and grounds ===
In 1891, Smith's trustees began planning improvements to the campus while developing a scientifically organized botanic garden for the college's recently established botany department. They commissioned landscape architect Frederick Law Olmsted to transform the campus into an arboretum. Olmsted arranged the upper campus as an irregular circle of buildings and favored a park-like setting with curved lines, open spaces, varied plantings, and relatively small-scale residential architecture rather than a monumental institutional plan.

A new student center, Kathleen McCartney Hall, overlooking Paradise Pond, is under construction using mass timber construction and is designed by women-owned firm TenBerke. Upon completion it will house the Lazarus Center for Career Development and the Wurtele Center for Leadership.

== Academics ==
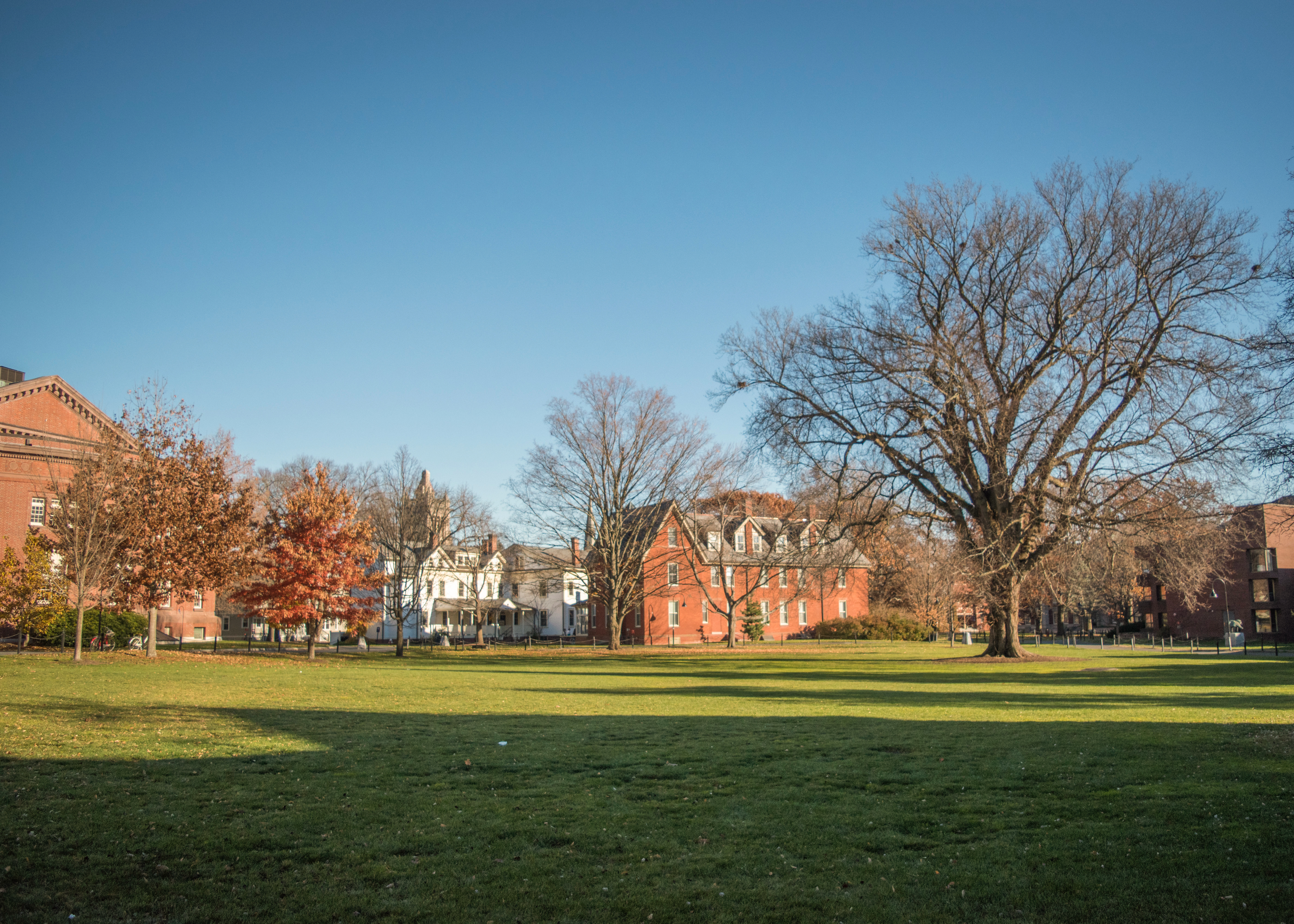
Smith's campus as it appears today

Smith College has 317 professors in 57 academic departments and programs, for a faculty-student ratio of 1:8.It was the first women's college in the United States to grant its own undergraduate degrees in engineering. The Picker Engineering Program offers a single ABET accredited Bachelor of Science in engineering science, combining the fundamentals of multiple engineering disciplines.

In 2008, Smith joined the SAT optional movement for undergraduate admission.

Smith runs its own junior year abroad (JYA) programs in four European cities: Paris, Hamburg, Florence, and Geneva. These programs are notable for requiring all studies to be conducted in the language of the host country (with both Paris and Geneva programs conducted in French). In some cases, students live in homestays with local families. Nearly half of Smith's juniors study overseas, either through Smith JYA programs or at more than 40 other locations around the world.

Junior math majors from other undergraduate institutions are invited to study at Smith College for one year through the Center for Women in Mathematics. Established in the fall of 2007 by Professors Ruth Haas and Jim Henle, the program aims to allow young women to improve their mathematical abilities through classwork, research, and involvement in a department centered on women. The Center also offers a post-baccalaureate year of math study to women who did not major in mathematics as undergraduates or whose mathematics major was not strong.

The Louise W. and Edmund J. Kahn Liberal Arts Institute supports collaborative research without regard to the traditional boundaries of academic departments and programs. Each year the institute supports long-term and short-term projects proposed, planned, and organized by members of the Smith College faculty. By becoming Kahn Fellows, students get involved in interdisciplinary research projects and work alongside faculty and visiting scholars for a year.

Students can develop leadership skills through Smith's two-year Phoebe Reese Lewis Leadership Program. Participants train in public speaking, analytical thinking, teamwork strategies, and the philosophical aspects of leadership.

Through Smith's internship program, "Praxis: The Liberal Arts at Work," all undergraduates are guaranteed access to one college-funded internship during their years at the college. This program enables students to access interesting self-generated internship positions in social welfare and human services, the arts, media, health, education, and other fields.

Its most popular undergraduate majors, based on 2021 graduates, were:

- Research & Experimental Psychology (49)
- Biology/Biological Sciences (48)
- Political Science & Government (45)
- Engineering Science (36)
- History (30)
- English Language & Literature (25)
- Mathematics (23)
- Economics (23)
- Computer Science (22)

=== Ada Comstock Scholars Program ===
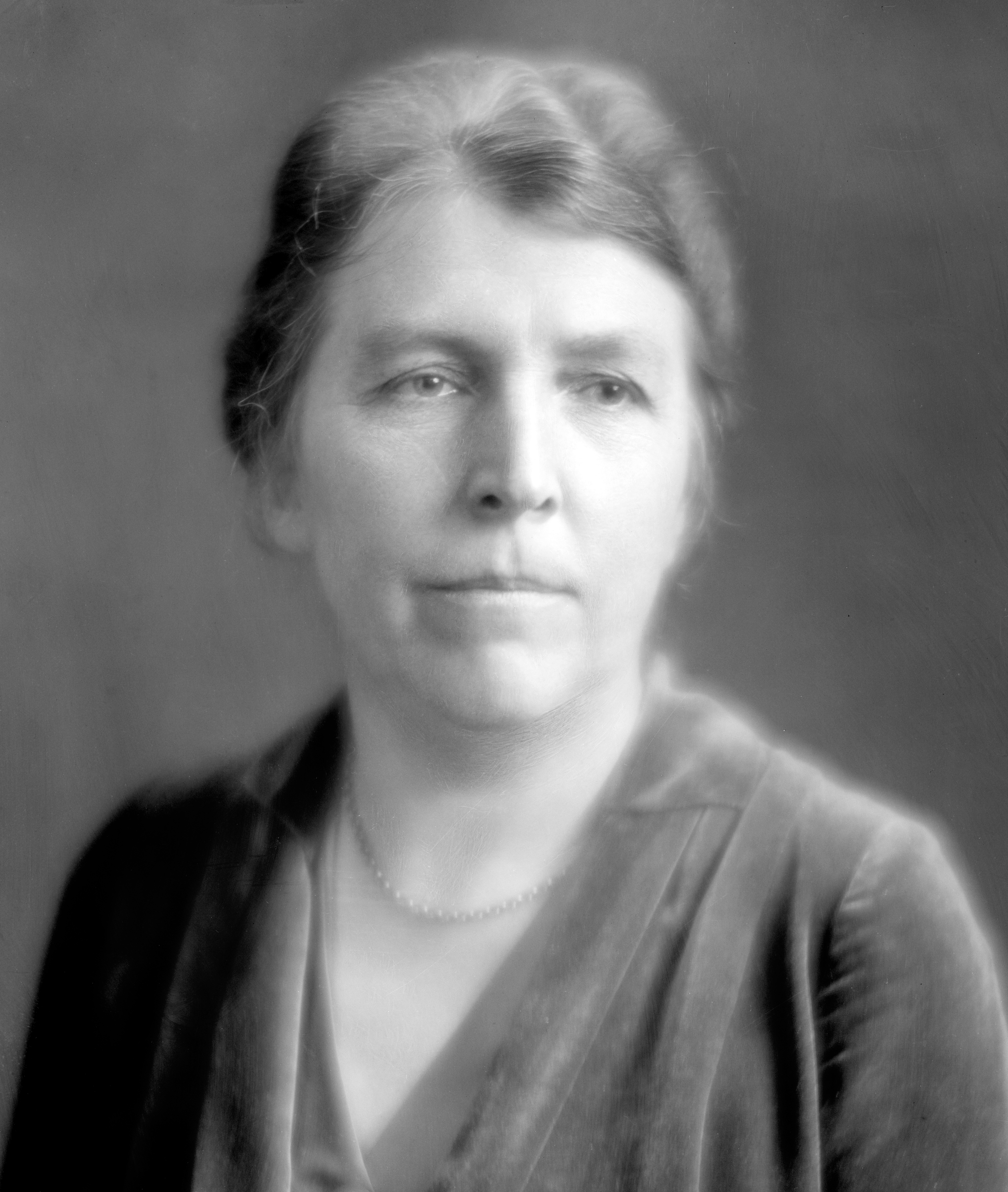
Ada Comstock, class of 1897

The Ada Comstock Scholars Program is an undergraduate degree program that serves Smith students of nontraditional college age. The program accommodates approximately 100 women ranging in age from mid-twenties to over sixty. Ada Comstock Scholars attend the same classes as traditional undergraduates, either full or part-time, and participate fully in a variety of extracurricular activities. They may live on or off campus. Financial aid is available to each Ada Comstock Scholar with demonstrated need.

Beginning in 1968, with the approval of the Committee on Educational Policy, Smith College initiated a trial program loosely titled The Continuing Education Degree for several women of non-traditional age who were looking to complete their unfinished degrees. Their successes inspired President Thomas C. Mendenhall and Dean Alice Dickinson to officially expand the program. In January 1975, the Ada Comstock Scholars Program was formally established under President Jill Ker Conway and in the fall of that year, forty-five women were enrolled. The students range in age, background, and geographical location. The growth of the program peaked at just over 400 students in 1988.

The program is named for Ada Louise Comstock Notestein (1876–1973), an 1897 Smith graduate, professor of English and dean of Smith from 1912 to 1923, and president of Radcliffe College from 1923 to 1943. Ada Comstock Notestein devoted much of her life to the academic excellence of women. Considering education and personal growth to be a lifelong process, she stayed actively involved in women's higher education until her death at the age of 97.

=== Graduate degrees and study options ===
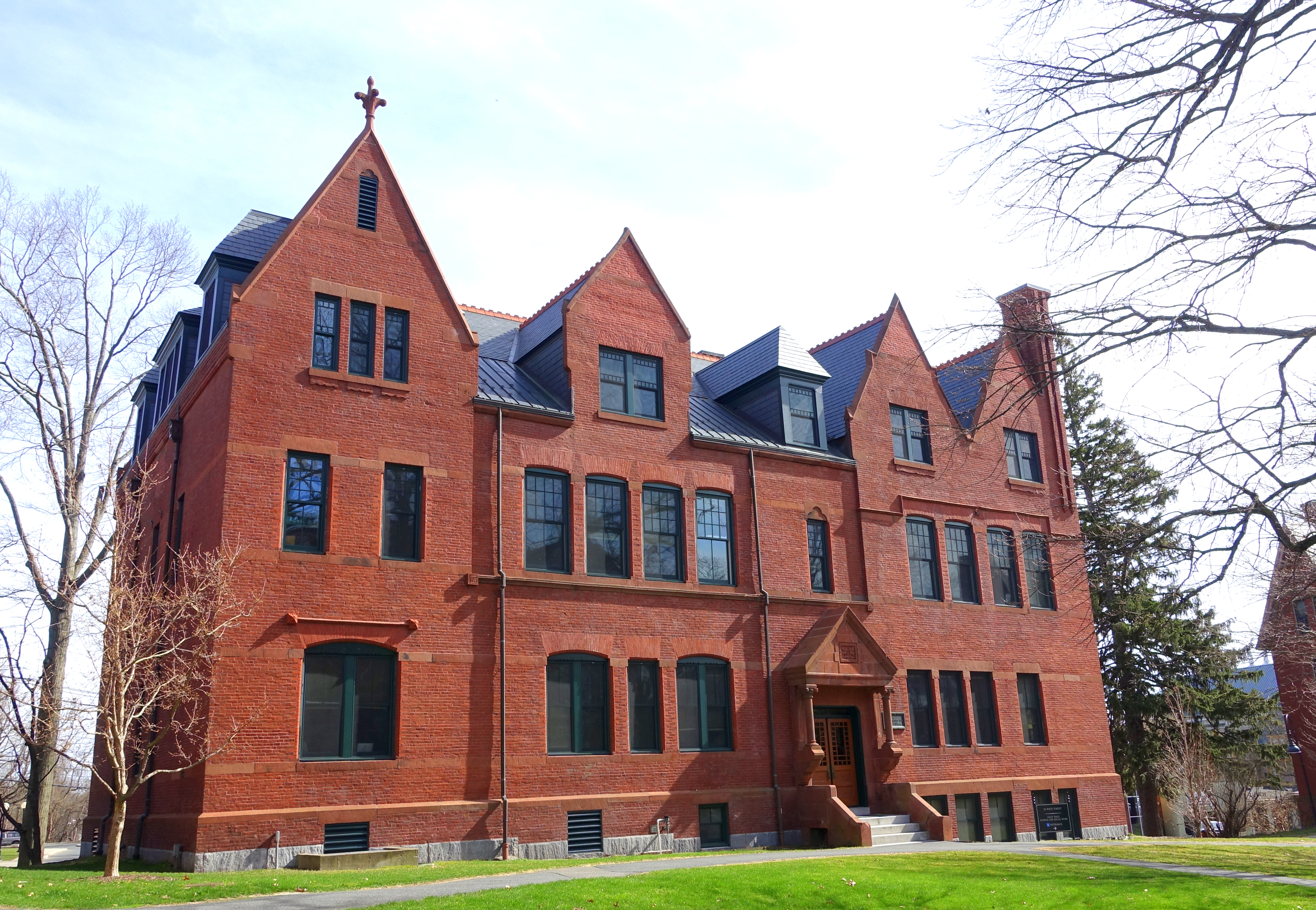
The Smith College School for Social Work is housed in Lily Hall.

Smith's graduate program is open to applicants of any gender. Degrees offered are Master of Arts in teaching (elementary, middle or high school), master of fine arts, master of education of the deaf, Master of Science in biological sciences, Master of Science in exercise and sport studies and master and Ph.D. in social work. In special one-year programs, international students may qualify for a certificate of graduate studies or a diploma in American studies. Each year approximately 100 men and women pursue advanced graduate work at Smith.

Also offered as a non-degree studies program is the Diploma in American Studies.

The Smith College School for Social Work is nationally recognized for its specialization in clinical social work and puts a heavy emphasis on direct field work practice. The program is accredited by the Council on Social Work Education. The school offers a Master of Social Work (M.S.W.) degree as well as a Ph.D. program designed to prepare MSWs for leadership positions in clinical research education and practice.

The college has a limited number of other programs leading to Ph.D.s and is part of a cooperative doctoral program co-administered by Amherst College, Hampshire College, Mount Holyoke College and the University of Massachusetts Amherst.

== Admissions and rankings ==
=== Admissions ===
The 2022 annual ranking of U.S. News & World Report categorizes Smith as 'most selective'.

For the Class of 2027 (enrolling fall 2023), Smith received 9,868 applications (reflecting a 36 percent increase over last year), accepted 1,875 (19.0%), and enrolled 630. Smith’s applicant pool has increased 36 percent over the past year, which the college attributes to the decision to move to ‘loan-free’ financial aid. The middle 50% range of SAT scores was 670–750 for critical reading and 670–770 for math, while the middle 50% range for the ACT composite score was 31–34 for enrolled first-year students. The average SAT for Smith College is 1430 even though Smith is also a test-optional college.

=== Rankings ===
Academic rankings

Liberal arts
- U.S. News & World Report: 13 (tied)
- Washington Monthly: 27

National
- Forbes: 89
- WSJ/College Pulse: 41

U.S. News & World Report's 2025 rankings placed Smith tied for the 14th overall best liberal arts college in the U.S., and rated it 24th for "Best Value", tied for 15th in "Best Undergraduate Engineering Program" at schools where a doctorate is not offered, 21st in "Best Undergraduate Teaching", and tied for 18th in "Top Performers on Social Mobility". In 2025, Forbes rated Smith 135th overall in its America's Top Colleges ranking of 500 military academies, national universities, and liberal arts colleges. Kiplinger's Personal Finance places Smith 16th in its 2019 ranking of 149 best value liberal arts colleges in the United States. For 2020, Washington Monthly ranked Smith 23rd among 218 liberal arts colleges in the U.S. based on its contribution to the public good, as measured by social mobility, research, and promoting public service. Smith College is accredited by the New England Commission of Higher Education.

== Traditions ==
=== Residential culture and student life ===
Smith requires most undergraduate students to live in on-campus houses unless they reside locally with their families. This policy is intended to add to the camaraderie and social cohesion of its students. Unlike most institutions of its type, Smith College does not have dorms, but rather 41 separate houses, ranging in architectural style from 18th-century to contemporary. It is rumored the architecture of Chapin House was the inspiration for the Tara Plantation House in Gone with the Wind. (Author Margaret Mitchell went to Smith for one year and lived in Chapin.) A novelty of Smith's homelike atmosphere is the continuing popularity of Sophia Smith's recipe for molasses cookies. These are often served at the traditional Friday afternoon tea held in each house, where students, faculty and staff members, and alumnae socialize.

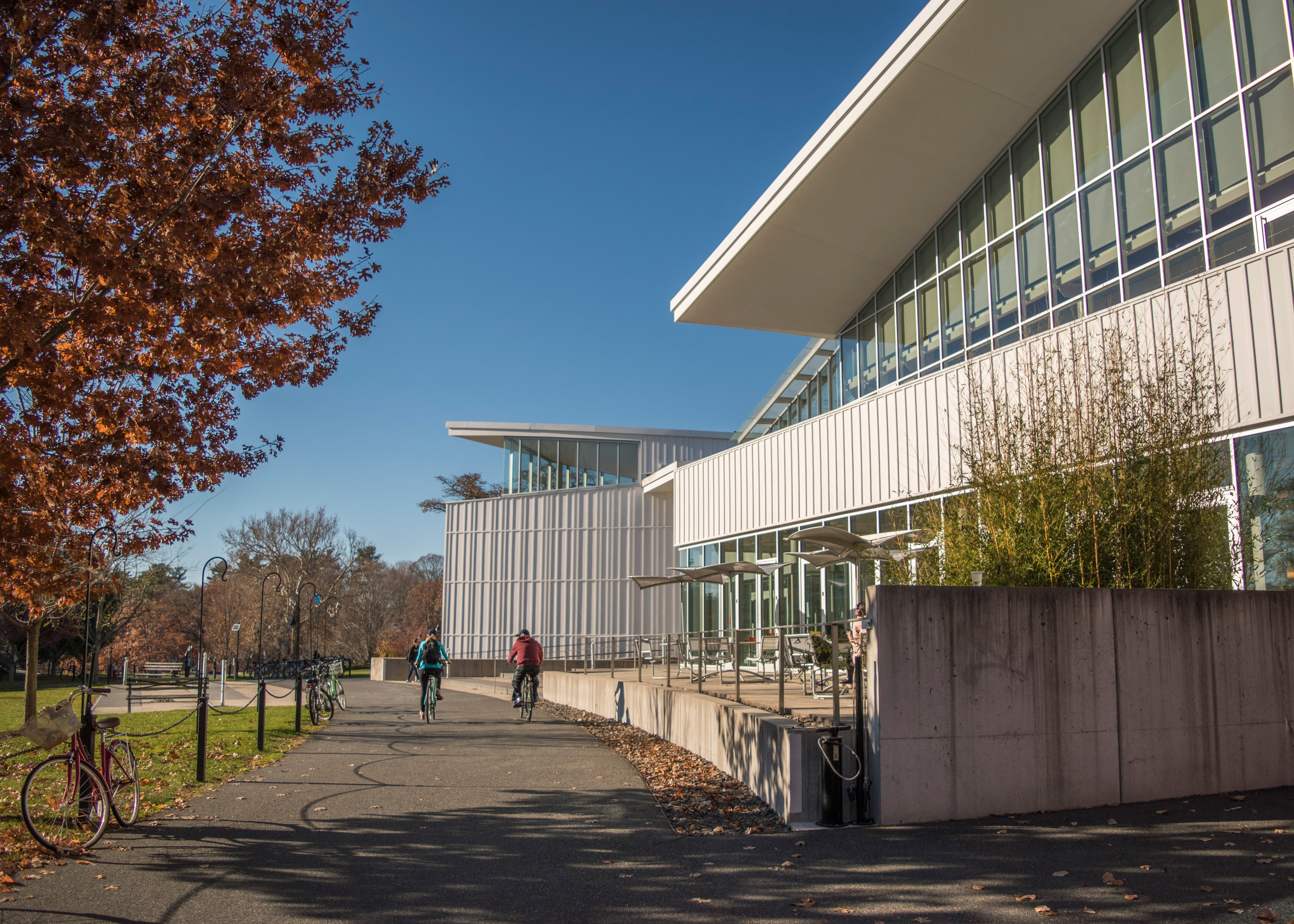
The Julia McWilliams Child '34 Campus Center at Smith College.

Two recent additions to the campus, both of which enhance its sense of community, are the architecturally dramatic Julia McWilliams Child '34 Campus Center and the state-of-the-art Olin Fitness Center.

In 2009, construction was also completed on Ford Hall, a new science and engineering facility. According to the Smith College website, Ford Hall is a "...facility that will intentionally blur the boundaries between traditional disciplines, creating an optimum environment for students and faculty to address key scientific and technological developments of our time." The building was officially dedicated on October 16, 2009.

The campus also boasts a botanic garden that includes a variety of specialty gardens including a rock garden and historic glass greenhouses dating back to 1895. The botanic garden formerly featured a Japanese tea hut, which was removed in October 2015 following concerns over "issues of safety and vandalism."

Smith continues to be a college focused on the education of women. Their website in 2025 clarifies: "Smith is a women’s college and considers for admission any applicants who self-identify as women; cis, trans, and nonbinary women are eligible to apply to Smith." Students who, after being admitted, transition to an identity other than "female" continue to be supported as Smith students. The Resource Center for Sexuality and Gender; The Office for Equity and Inclusion and its Trans/Non-binary Working Group; Transcending Gender, a student group focused on support and education; and the Transgender Support Group run by Counseling Services work to support trans and non-binary students at Smith across the gender identity spectrum.

==== Houses ====
Smith College has many different houses serving as dormitories. Each house is self-governing. While many students remain in the same house for the entirety of their four years at Smith, they are not obligated to do so and may move to different houses on campus as space allows. While houses previously collected dues, in the 2019–2020 school year they were eradicated to avoid placing financial pressure on low-income students or students who were otherwise unable to pay without sacrificing funding for the House.

Houses are found in four main regions of campus: Upper and Lower Elm Street, Green Street, Center Campus, and the Quadrangle. Each part can, in turn, be divided into smaller areas to more precisely provide the location of the house in question. In 2019, the college shifted from officially recognizing the four main areas of campus to instead categorizing houses in four neighborhoods: Ivy, Paradise, Mountain, and Garden. This change was largely internal and categorizes houses by size rather than location.

===== Green Street houses =====
- Hubbard House – Hubbard House is the residence of fictional President Selina Meyer from the HBO Show Veep. Julia Child resided in this house during her time at Smith.
- Lawrence House – Sylvia Plath resided in this house during her time at Smith.
- Morris House – Morris was built in 1891, with its sister house Lawrence to help accommodate the growing student body. It is named after Kate Morris Cone, Smith College class of 1879.
- Tyler House – Named after William Seymour Tyler, one of the original trustees of the college. Former First Lady Barbara Bush lived here before she left to marry George Bush.
- Washburn House – Washburn is named for former trustee and senator William B. Washburn. During the Second World War, the house served as a Spanish-speaking residence for students unable to study abroad.
- 44 Green Street
- 54 Green Street

===== Center Campus houses =====
- Cutter House
- Chapin House – Author Margaret Mitchell lived here. Chapin's staircase served as the inspiration for the staircase of Scarlett O'Hara's Tara in Gone With the Wind.
- Haven/Wesley Houses
- Hopkins House. What stands now was known as Little Hop when there were three houses. Hopkins A and Hopkins B were torn down to make a parking lot.
- Park Complex
  - Park Annex – One of two new Affinity houses at Smith College, houses that cater to minority identities on campus.
- Sessions Complex – The oldest house on the Smith campus. It has a secret passageway.
- Tenney House
- Ziskind House

===== Upper Elm Street houses =====
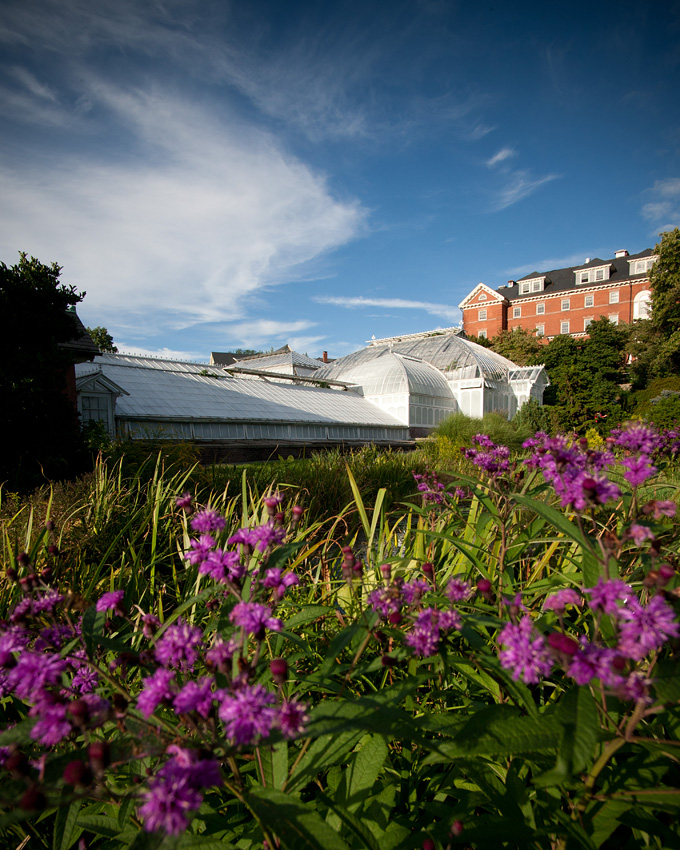
The Botanic Gardens at Smith College

- Capen House – Built in 1825 by Samuel Howe, the founder of Northampton Law School, it became part of the Capen School in 1883 and was willed to the college by the school's founder in 1921. It is designed in the Classical Revival style. It is named after the founder of the Capen School, Bessie Tilson Capen.
- Gillett House – Connected to Northrop house via a breezeway, Gillett houses the only vegan/vegetarian dining hall on campus.
- Lamont House – Built in 1955, Lamont House was the first house constructed after the construction of the Quad houses in 1936. Named for alumna Florence Corliss Lamont, who earned her A.B. in 1893 and later an M.A. from Columbia. She married Harvard graduate and future Smith Trustee Thomas Lamont and had four children. Throughout her life, she would continue to give generously to her alma mater. Lamont House is just across Elm Street, tucked behind Northrop and Gillett Houses. Lamont houses 83 students.
- Northrop House
- Parsons Complex
  - Parsons Annex – one of two new Affinity houses at Smith College, houses that cater to minority identities on campus.
- Talbot House – Built in 1909 as part of the Capen School, it was willed to the college in 1921. Its mascot is the moose. US First Lady Nancy Reagan '43 lived here during her time at Smith. It is also named for Bessie Tilson Capen.

===== Lower Elm Street houses =====
- Albright House
- Baldwin House – U.S. Senator Tammy Baldwin ('84) was a Baldwin House resident during her time at Smith College.
- Chase House – Once a school for girls from the 1870s until 1968 when it was acquired as housing for the college. It was once a Junior & Senior only house and now serves as a substance-free residence. Named after Mary Ellen Chase, a writer, and English professor.
- Conway House – A residence for Ada Comstock Scholars and their families, named after Smith President Jill Ker Conway
- Duckett House - Built in 1803, Duckett house is one of the oldest buildings on campus. Aside from affinity housing and special housing (Friedman’s, family complexes, co-ops, etc.) it is the smallest traditional house, with only 36 residents. Residents in Duckett are known as "Ducks", which is also the official mascot of the house. There is also a "duck shrine" in the common room, where small miniature ducks face a larger stuffed-animal duck. It is a long-held tradition for alums to leave small rubber ducks with their class year and initials on the table of the shrine, often the rubber duck you were gifted in your first year. The house is named for Eleanor Duckett, who taught in the English department at Smith in the 20th century. Per Eleanor Duckett’s journals and writing, recovered in the Smith special collections, Duckett was the "life-long partner"; of fellow English professor, Mary Ellen Chase. Many students joke that this is why Chase and Duckett houses are conjoined, existing together, but separately, in one building complex.
- 150 Elm Street

===== East Quadrangle houses =====
- Cushing House – named for math professor Eleanor P. Cushing; Gloria Steinem resided here during her time at Smith.
- Emerson House
- Jordan House – Built in 1922 and named for the longtime head of the Smith English Department, Mary Augusta Jordan.
- King House – Named for Franklin King, who served as the superintendent of building and grounds at Smith for 50 years
- Scales House -King's "sister house," was named after Laura Woolsey Lord Scales, who graduated from Smith in 1901 and was the school's first dean of students

===== West Quadrangle houses =====
- Comstock House – Named after Ada Comstock class of 1897, former dean of the college and president of Radcliffe College
- Gardiner House
- Morrow House – Named after Elizabeth Cutter Morrow, class of 1896 and former acting president of the college
- Haynes House - Originally named Wilder House, this house was renamed in 2024 in recognition of the mathematician Euphemia Haynes after concerns were raised about the scholarly legacy of Harris Hawthorne Wilder and Inez Whipple Wilder, Smith-affiliated zoologists for whom the house was originally named
- Wilson House – Named after Martha Wilson, class of 1895
- Paradise Apartments – each complex is named after a notable Smith Alum

==== Campus folklore ====
Smith has numerous folk tales and ghost stories emerging from the histories of some of its historic buildings. It was named the most haunted college in America by College Consensus. One such tale holds Sessions House is inhabited by the ghost of Lucy Hunt, who died of a broken heart after being separated from her lover, General Burgoyne. Reports of a ghost in Sessions House predate its history as a campus house. Built in 1751 by the Hunt family, the house has a secret staircase where, according to legend, the Hunt's eldest daughter Lucy would rendezvous with her lover, General Burgoyne. The two were ultimately driven apart, and in the 1880s it was believed the ghost of a heartbroken Burgoyne haunted the staircase. Since Sessions House became part of college housing in the 20th century, the specter has taken on a decidedly feminine identity, and some former residents of Sessions House claim to have seen Lucy's ghost in the stairwell. The secret staircase has since been boarded up. On the third floor of Sessions House, there is a hinged hole in the wall where the secret staircase can be seen.

==== Clubs, sports, and organizations ====
In addition to its 11 varsity sports, there are currently more than 120 clubs and organizations.

===== Athletics =====
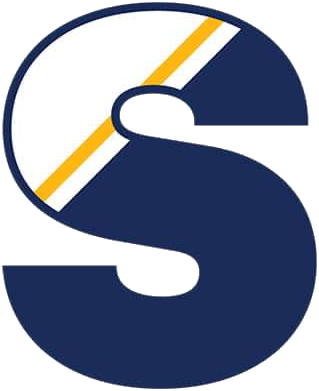
Smith athletics logo

Since 1986, Smith's athletic teams were known as the Pioneers. The name expressed the spirit of Smith's students and the college's leading role in women's athletics (the first women's basketball game was played at Smith in 1893).

A new spirit mark was unveiled to the Smith community in December 2008. The new visual identity for Smith's sports teams marks the culmination of a yearlong project to promote visibility and enthusiasm for Smith's intercollegiate and club teams—and to generate school spirit broadly. The spirit mark is used for athletics uniforms, casual apparel, and promotional items for clubs and organizations. As Smith was the first women's college to join the NCAA, the new mark is seen as linking the college's pioneering alumnae athletes to their equally determined and competitive counterparts today. Smith athletes won some of the early national intercollegiate women's tennis championships in singles (Louise Raymond, 1938 and 1939) and doubles (1933, 1935, 1938 and 1948).

On May 7, 2025, Smith unveiled a new moniker. The Smith Bears took over as the new mascot following a survey indicating that student athletes did not identify with the Pioneer moniker. In an official statement from the college, the name change was explained as recognizing faculty alum Senda "the Bear" Berenson, inductee to the Naismith Memorial Basketball Hall of Fame, the Women's Basketball Hall of Fame, and the International Jewish Sports Hall of Fame.

Smith College does not have college colors in the usual sense. Its official color is white, trimmed with gold, but the official college logo is blue and yellow (a previous logo was burgundy and white). NCAA athletic teams have competed in blue and white (or blue and yellow, in the case of the soccer, crew, swimming, and squash teams) uniforms since the 1970s. Popular club sports are free to choose their own colors and mascot; both Rugby and Fencing have chosen red and black.

Smith has a rotating system of class colors dating back to the 1880s when intramural athletics and other campus competitions were usually held by class. Today, class colors are yellow, red, blue, and green, with incoming first-year classes assigned the color of the previous year's graduating class; their color then "follows" them through to graduation. Alumnae classes, particularly at reunions, continue to identify with and use their class color thereafter.

===== Cultural organizations =====
There are 11 chartered cultural organizations that fall under the UNITY title: the Asian Students’ Association (ASA), Black Students’ Alliance (BSA), Chinese Interregional Student Cultural Org (CISCO), South Asian Student Association of Smith (EKTA), Indigenous Smith Students and Allies (ISSA), International Students Organization (ISO), Korean Students Association (KSA), the Latin American Students Organization (LASO), Multiethnic Interracial Smith College (MISC), Smithies of Caribbean Ancestry (SOCA), and the Vietnamese Students Association (VSA). Smith College Website Multicultural Affairs The Black Students’ Alliance is the oldest of all Unity organizations. In the Fall of 2012, as an effort to document the history of students of color on the Smith campus, the Weaving Voices Archives Project was created.

=== Reunions and commencement events ===
The Alumnae Association of Smith College hosts official class reunions every five years. All alumnae from all classes are welcome to return in any year; "off-year" alumnae attend campus-wide events as the "Class of 1776." There have also been several controversies at Smith's commencement ceremonies.

== Alumnae ==
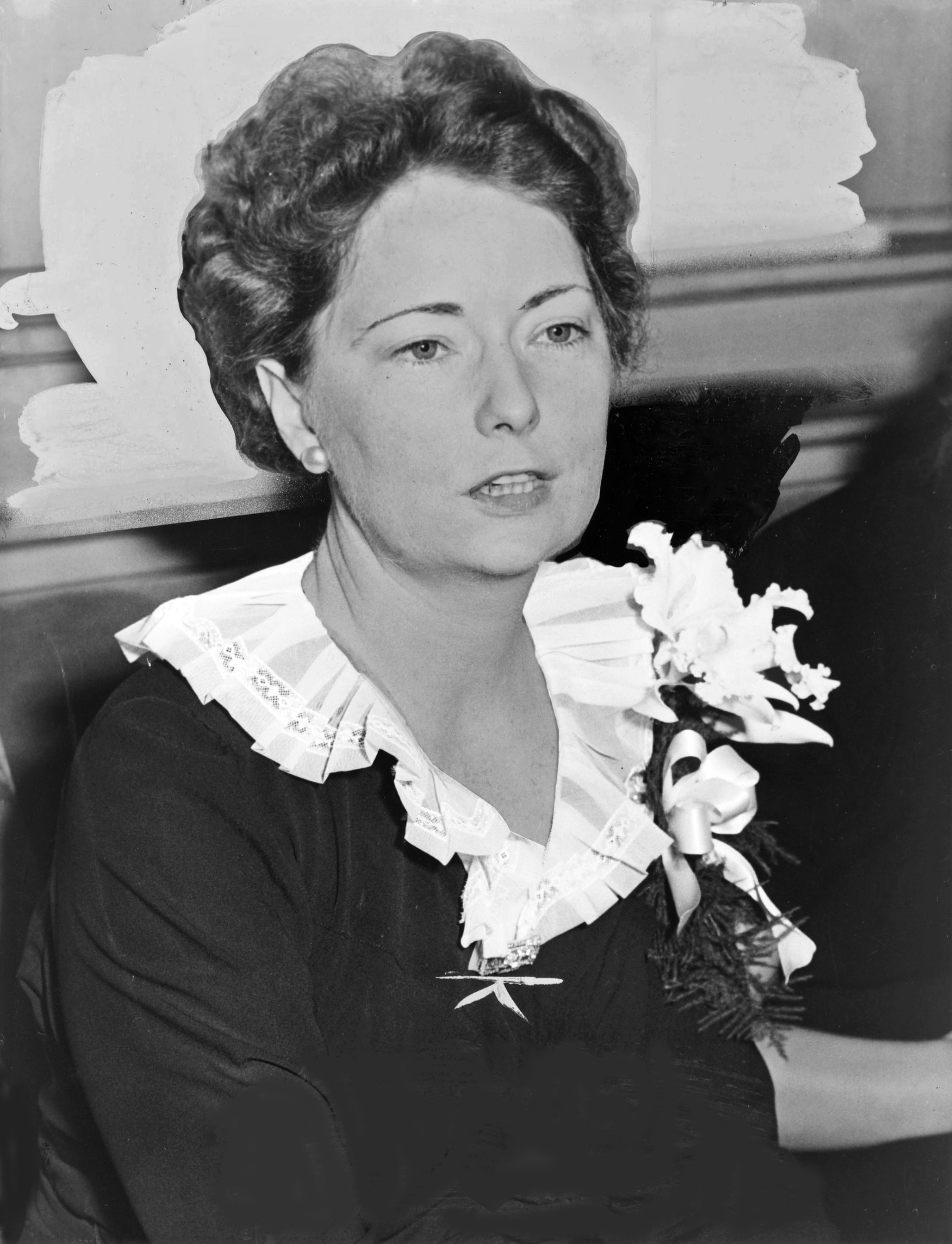
Pulitzer Prize-winning writer Margaret Mitchell

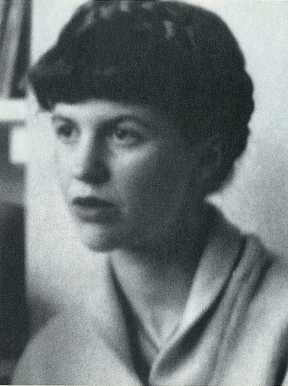
Pulitzer Prize-winning writer Sylvia Plath

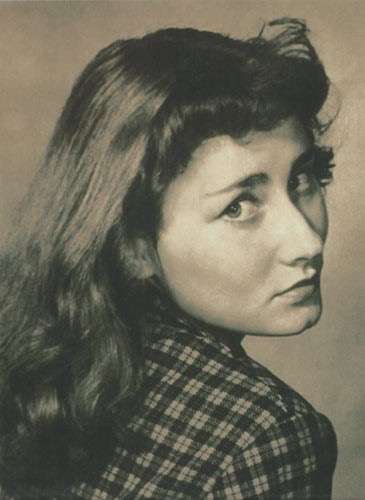
Polish poet Halina Poświatowska

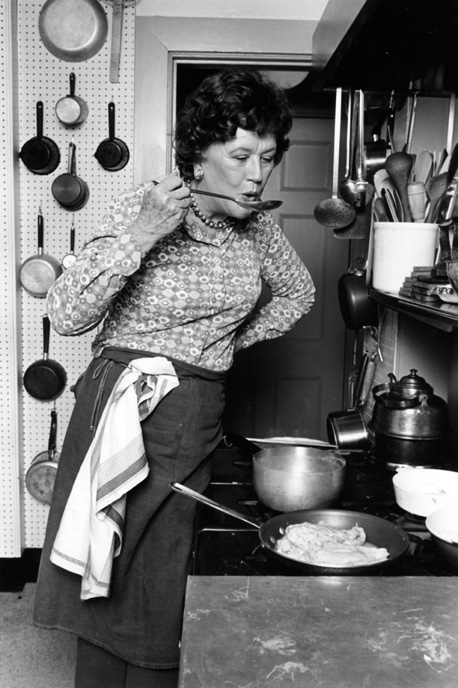
Chef and television personality Julia Child

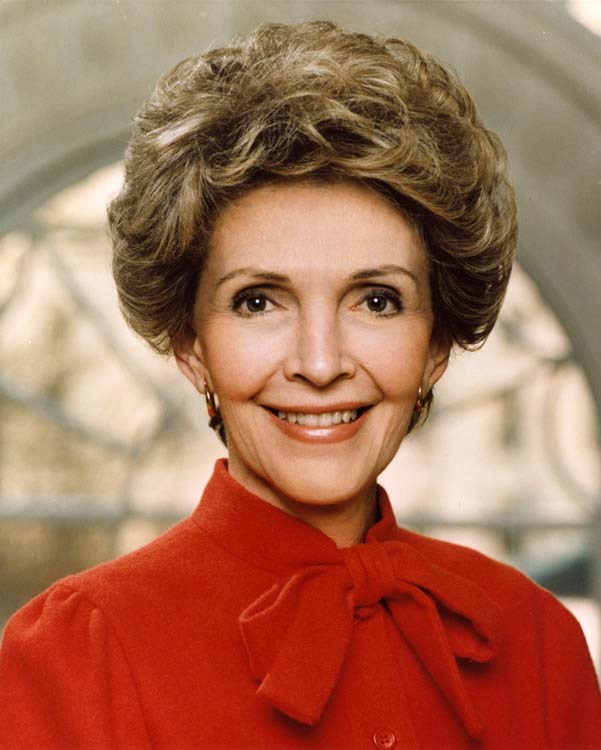
40th First Lady of the United States Nancy Reagan

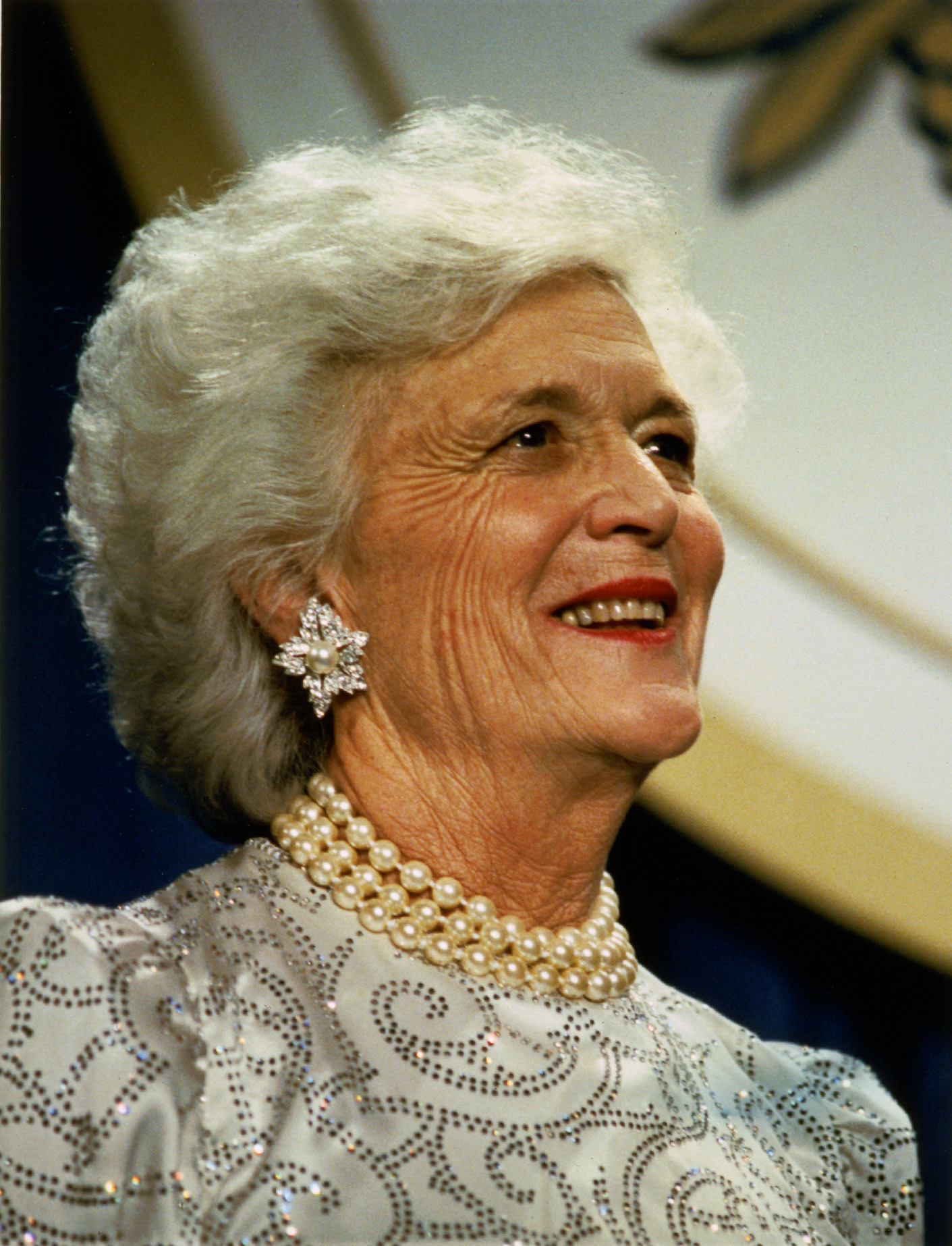
41st First Lady of the United States Barbara Bush

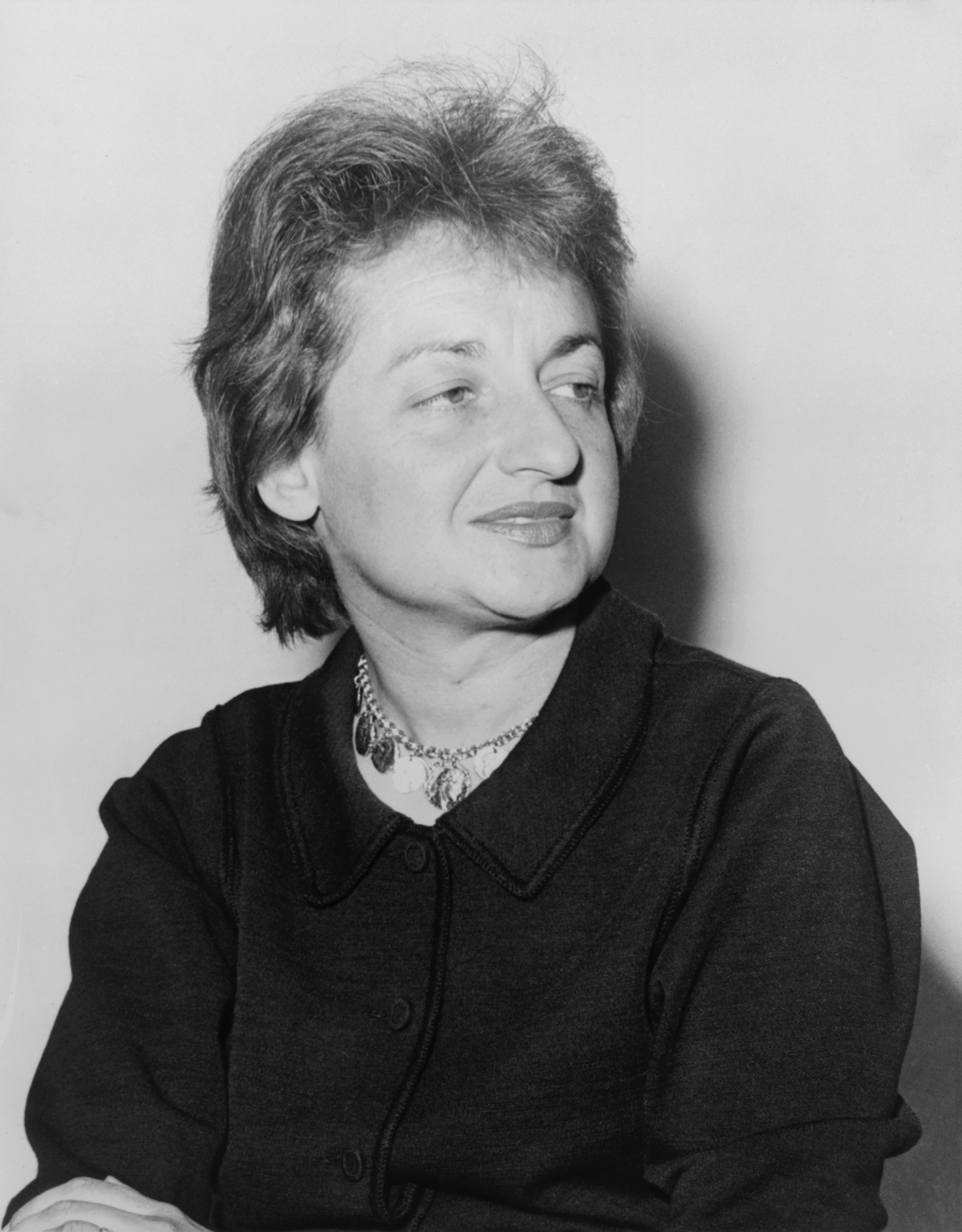
Feminist activist Betty Friedan

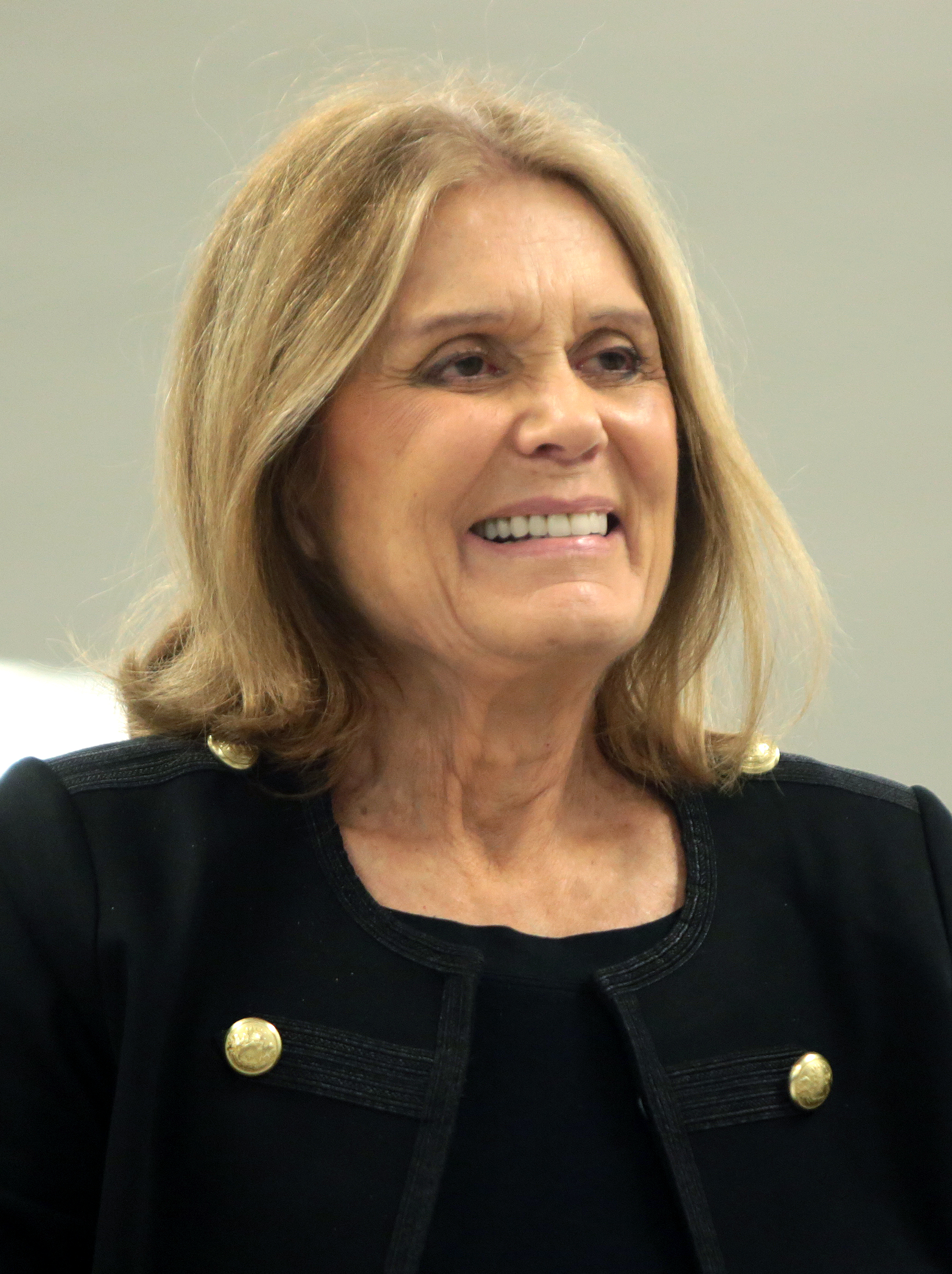
Feminist activist Gloria Steinem

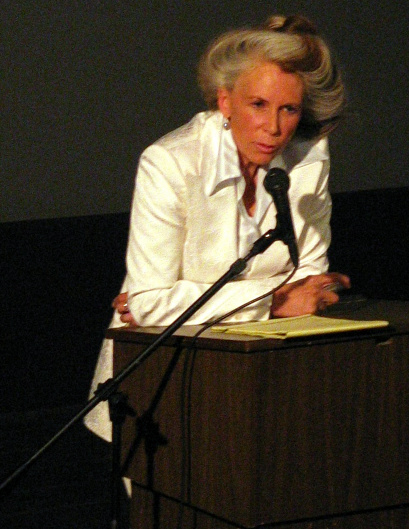
Feminist and legal scholar Catharine A. MacKinnon

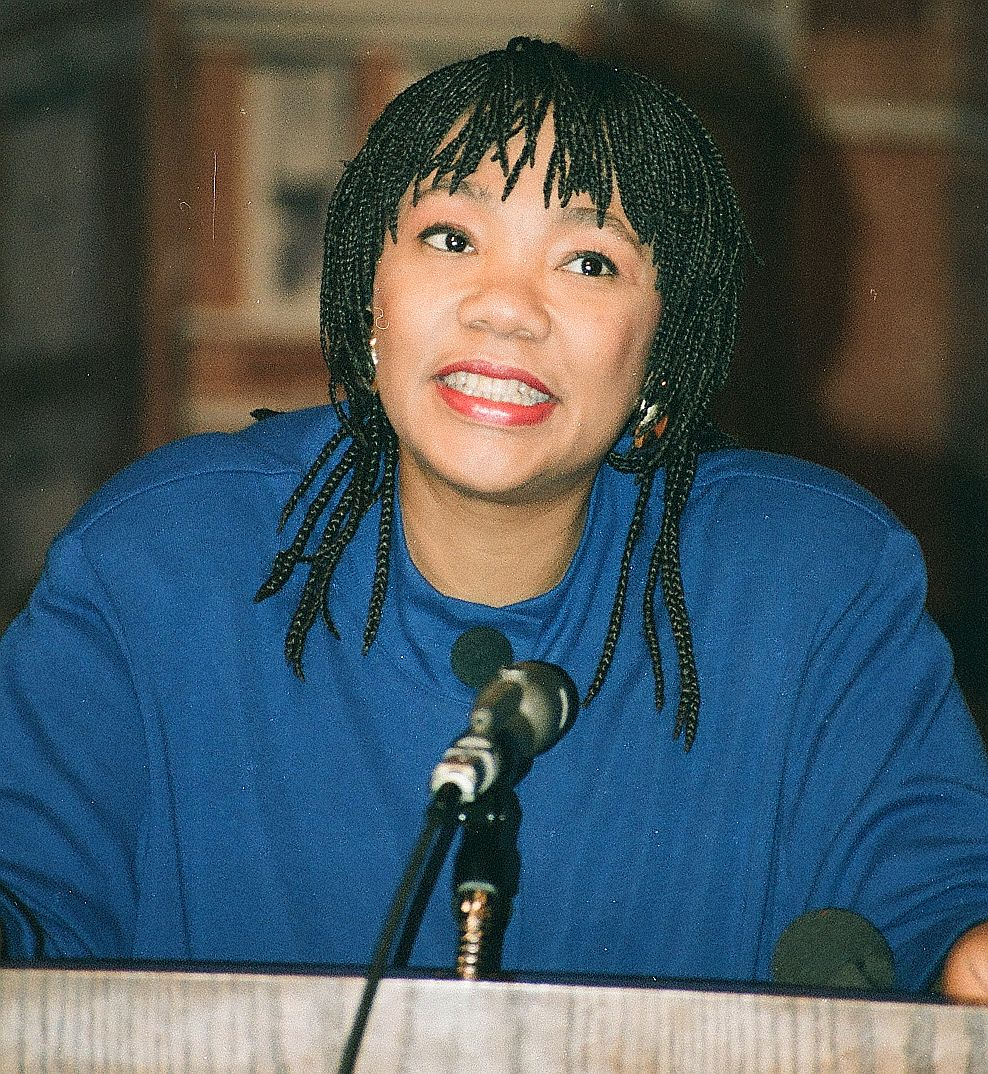
Civil rights activist Yolanda King

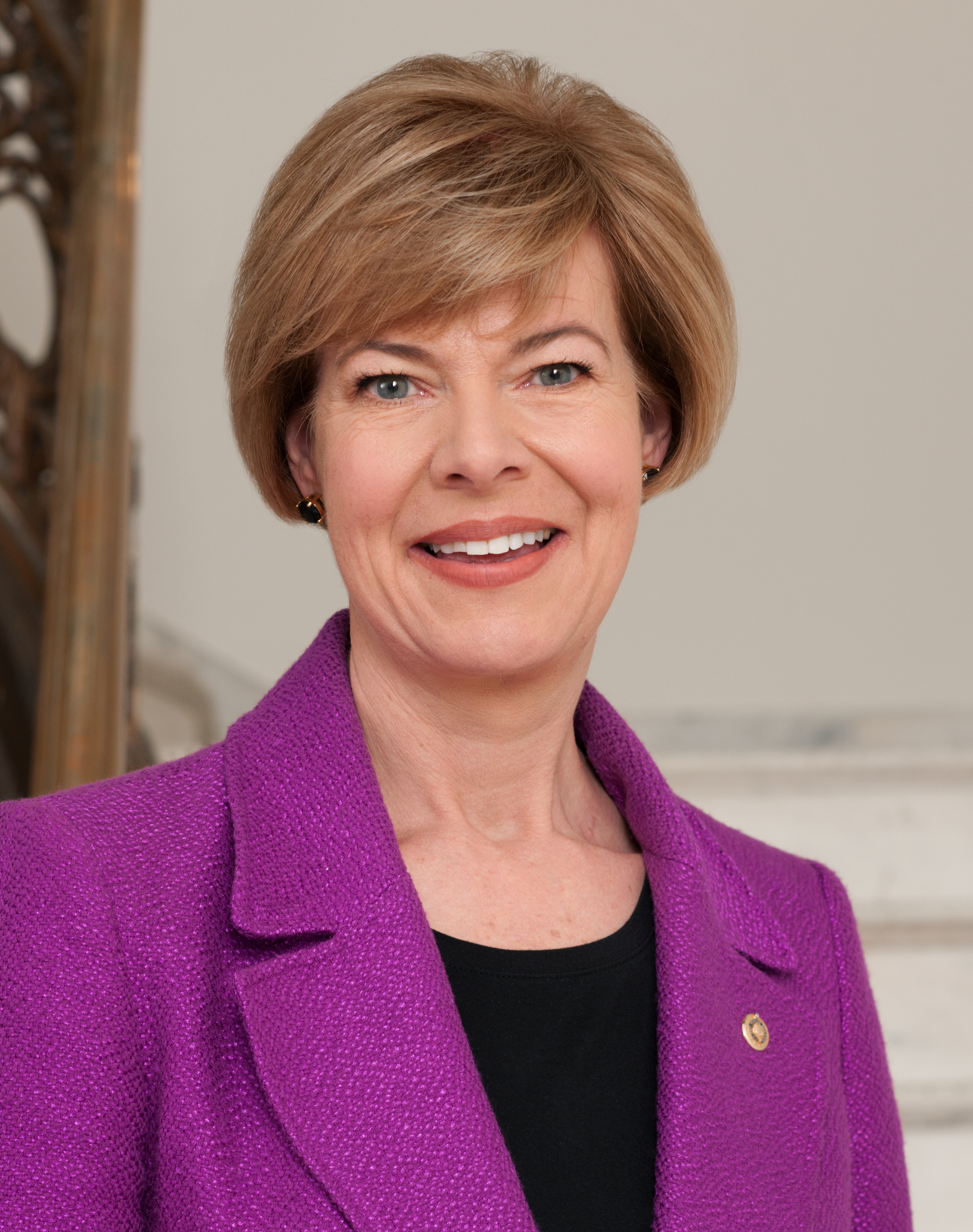
U.S. Senator for Wisconsin and first openly LGBTQ+ person elected to Congress Tammy Baldwin

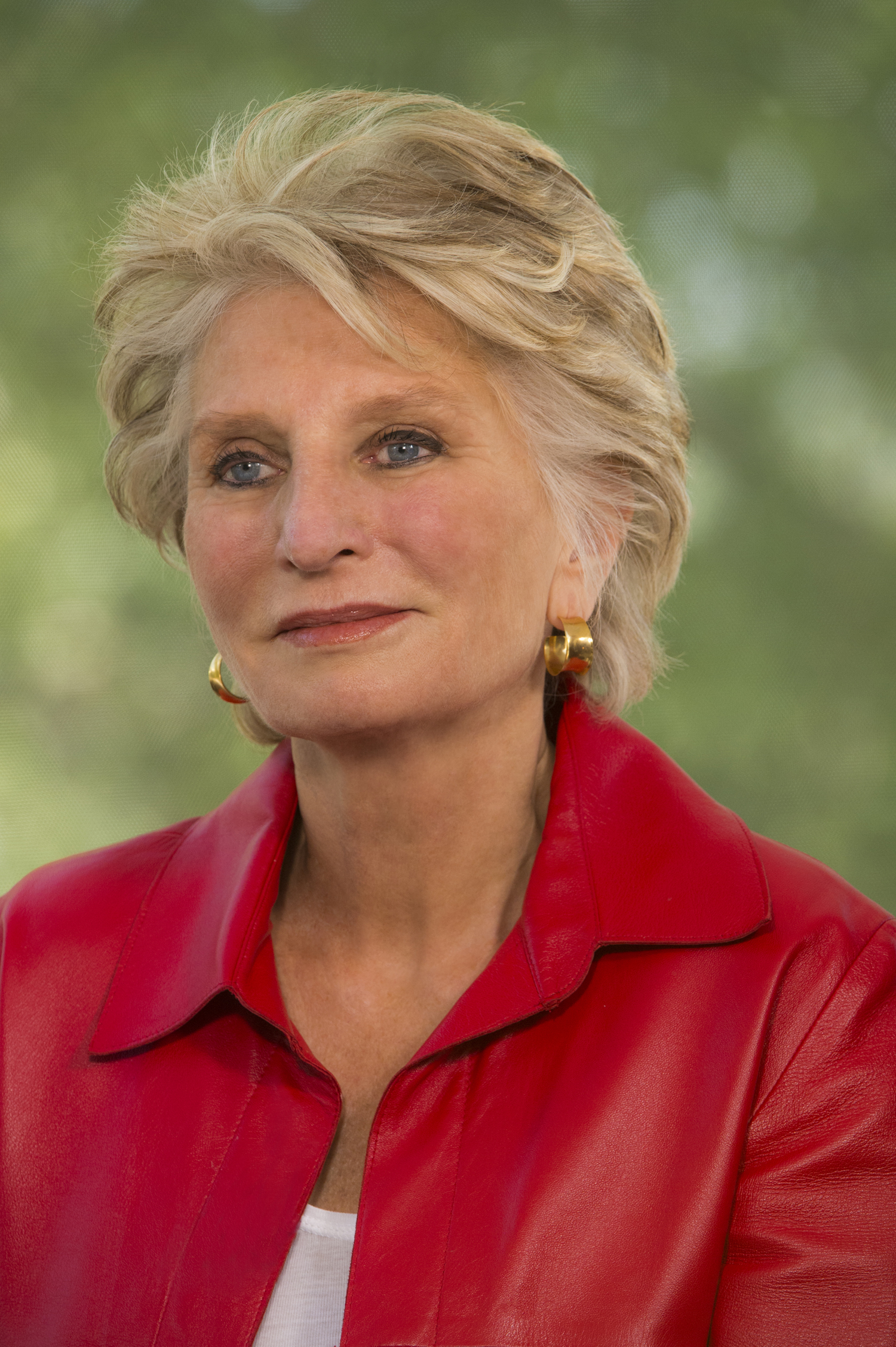
Former U.S. Congress Member Jane Harman

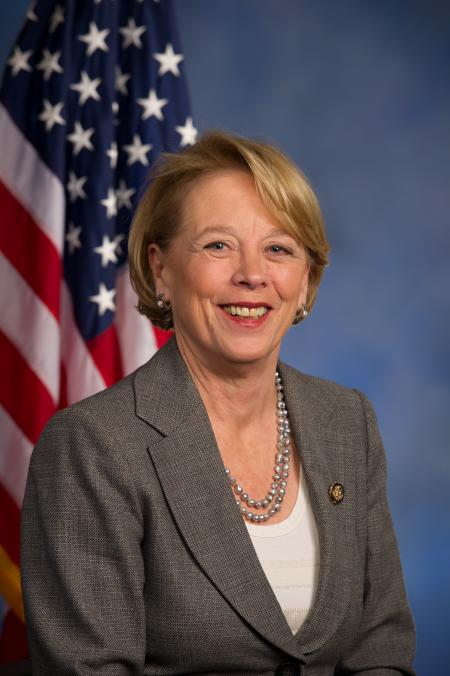
Former U.S. Congress Member Niki Tsongas

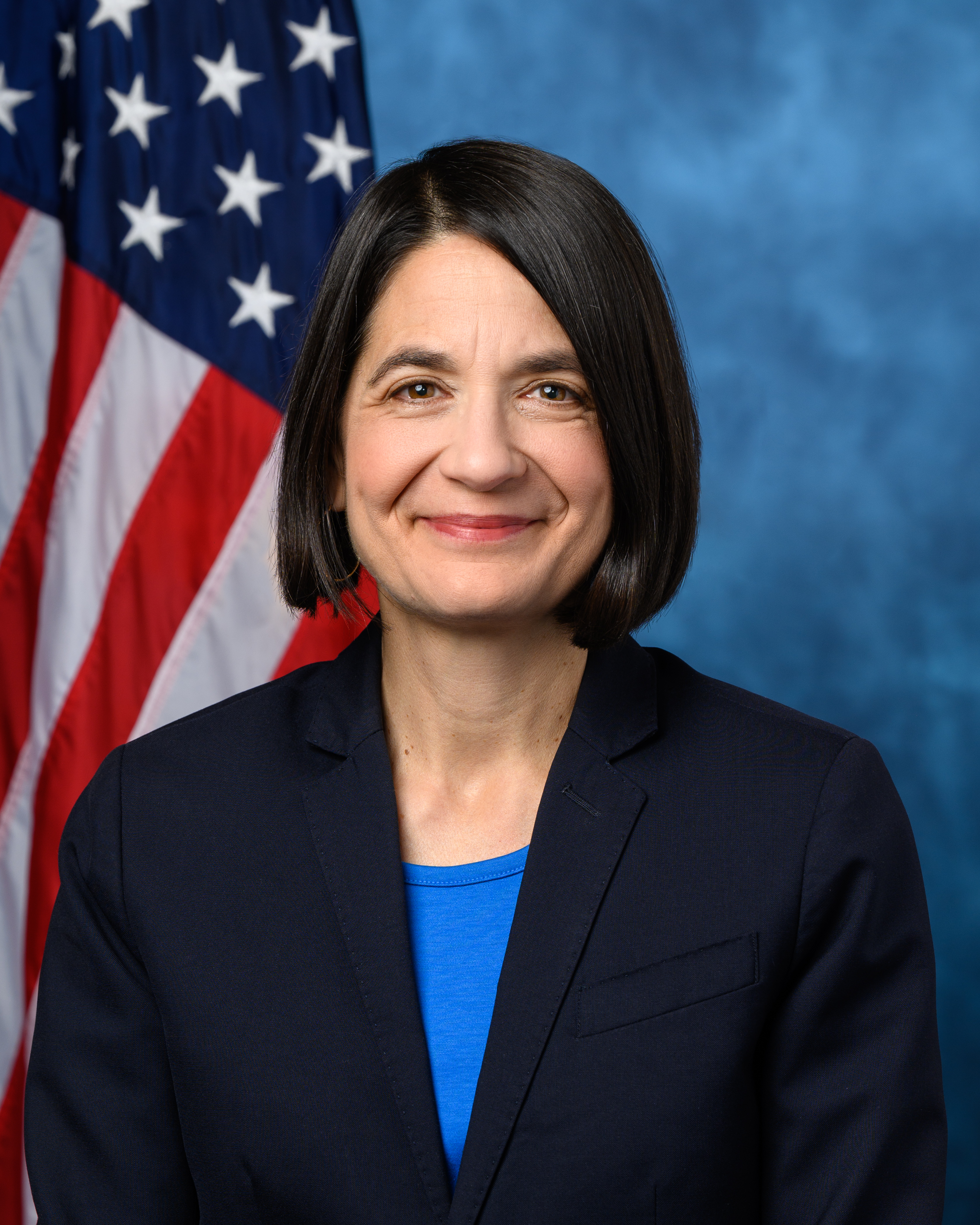
U.S. Congress Member Becca Balint

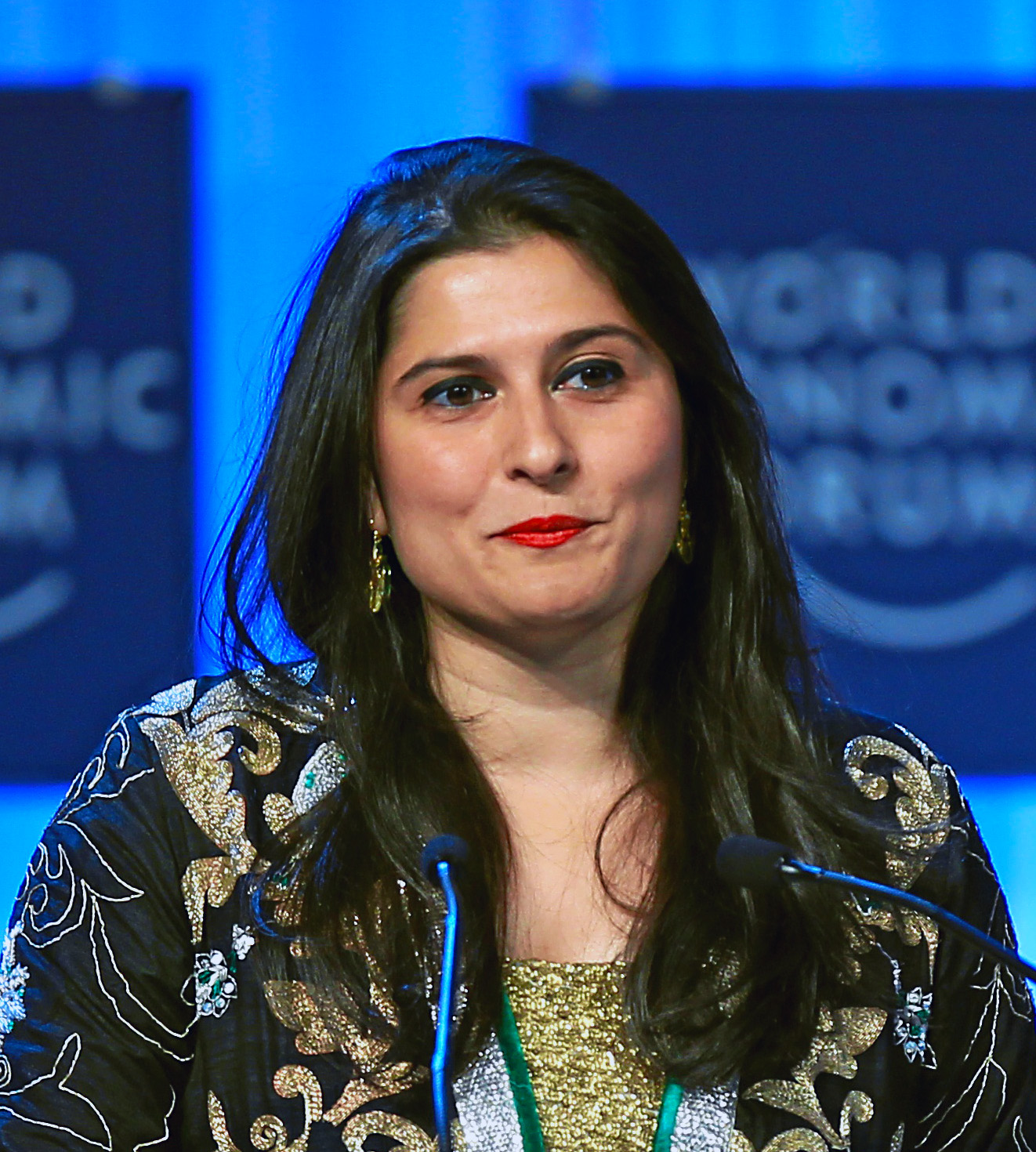
Academy Awards-winning documentarian Sharmeen Obaid-Chinoy

Among the more notable of Smith College's alumnae in chronological order are:

- Otelia Cromwell (class of 1900): first African-American graduate of Smith College and the first African American woman to receive a doctorate from Yale
- Blanche Hinman Dow (class of 1913): former president of the American Association of University Women
- Clara Savage Littledale (Class of 1913): writer and war reporter for Good Housekeeping, and Parents editor for over thirty years.
- Eunice Carter (class of 1921): first female African-American assistant district attorney for the state of New York, active in the prosecution of mob boss Charles "Lucky" Luciano
- Margaret Mitchell (class of 1922): author of Gone with the Wind, did not graduate from Smith
- Mary Watson Weaver (class of 1925): composer and poet
- Julia Child (class of 1934): chef, author, and television personality
- Constance Morrow Morgan (class of 1935): educator, philanthropist and trustee of Smith College from 1956 to 1971
- Madeleine L'Engle (class of 1941): author best known for A Wrinkle in Time
- Betty Friedan (class of 1942): feminist and author of The Feminine Mystique
- Nancy Reagan (class of 1943): First Lady of the United States from 1981 to 1989
- Penny Chenery (class of 1943): sportswoman, racehorse breeder, and owner, horse racing advocate
- Jean Harris (class of 1945): headmistress of the Madeira School who murdered her ex-lover Herman Tarnower in a jealous rage
- Rhoda Dorsey (class of 1946): historian and first woman president of Goucher College
- Barbara Bush (class of 1947): former First Lady of the United States, did not graduate from Smith
- Mary Otis Stevens (class of 1949): American architect
- Natalie Babbitt (class of 1954): notable illustrator and author of Tuck Everlasting
- Sylvia Plath (class of 1955): poet, novelist, and short story author
- Gloria Steinem (class of 1956): founder of Ms. magazine and noted feminist, activist, and journalist
- Lynden B. Miller (class of 1960): public garden designer, park advocate, and author
- Jane Yolen (class of 1960): children's book author
- Susan Hiller (class of 1961): conceptual artist
- Ng'endo (Florence) Mwangi (class of 1961): Kenya's first woman physician
- Anne Mollegen Smith (née Anne Rush Mollegen), (class of 1961), first woman editor-in-chief of Redbook
- Halina Poświatowska (class of 1961): Polish poet and writer
- Jane Harman (class of 1966): U.S. Representative for California's 36th Congressional District
- Molly Ivins (class of 1966): journalist, political commentator, and humorist
- Shelly Lazarus (class of 1968): former CEO and chairman of Ogilvy & Mather
- Niki Tsongas (class of 1968): U.S. Representative for Massachusetts' 3rd Congressional District
- Catharine MacKinnon (class of 1968): notable proponent of radical feminism, scholar, lawyer, teacher and activist
- Laura D'Andrea Tyson (class of 1969): economist; Director of the National Economic Council
- Yolanda King (class of 1976): activist
- Christine McCarthy (class of 1977): Chief Financial Officer of The Walt Disney Company
- Ann M. Martin (class of 1978): author of The Babysitter's Club
- Phebe Novakovic (class of 1979): Chairman and CEO of General Dynamics
- Ruth Ozeki (class of 1980): author of A Tale for the Time Being
- Margaret Edson (class of 1983): winner of a Pulitzer Prize for Drama
- Tammy Baldwin (class of 1984): United States Senator; first openly LGBT person to be elected to congress
- Tori Murden (class of 1985): the first woman to row solo across the Atlantic Ocean, and to ski to the geographic South Pole
- Thelma Golden (class of 1987): Director and Chief Curator of The Studio Museum in Harlem
- Nancy La Vigne (class of 1987): criminologist and director of the National Institute of Justice
- Erin K. O'Shea (class of 1988): president of the Howard Hughes Medical Institute (HHMI)
- Durreen Shahnaz (class of 1989): founder of Impact Investment Exchange (IIX)
- Becca Balint (class of 1990): current member of the United States House of Representatives from Vermont
- Jennifer Chrisler (class of 1992): executive director of the Family Equality Council
- Piper Kerman (class of 1992): Orange Is the New Black author, lived in Chapin House
- Deborah Archer (class of 1993): first Black person to be elected President of American Civil Liberties Union (ACLU)
- Kim Janey (class of 1994): first woman and first Black person to serve as mayor of the City of Boston
- Hanya Yanagihara (class of 1995): author and editor
- Emily W. Murphy (class of 1995) Administrator of the General Services Administration under Donald Trump
- Dorie Clark, (class of 1997): author and executive education professor
- Luma Mufleh (class of 1997): founder and director of Fugees Family, Inc.
- Cass Bird (class of 1999): fashion photographer
- Erin Morgenstern (class of 2000): The Night Circus author
- Sara Haines (class of 2000): co-host of The View, ABC News correspondent
- Rose Jang (class of 2001): Award winning pop opera singer and violinist. The first official Korean American Ambassador of Tourism for South Korea
- Rubaiyat Hossain (class of 2002): filmmaker of feature films Under Construction and Made in Bangladesh
- Sharmeen Obaid-Chinoy (class of 2002): documentarian, winner of two Academy Awards
- Lydia Jett (class of 2002): investor, board member and Founding Partner of Softbank Vision Fund
- Julia Scott (class of 2002): NPR and New York Times journalist
- Kimberly Drew (class of 2012): art curator and cultural critic

== Notable staff ==
- Herbert Baxter Adams (1850–1901), educator, historian, and cofounder of the American Historical Association taught history at Smith from 1878 to 1881.
- Newton Arvin, American literary critic and academic
- Leonard Baskin, an artist who taught at Smith from 1953 to 1974
- Mary Ellen Chase, educator and author, taught English at Smith from 1926 to 1955.
- Emily Hale, speech and drama teacher, and muse of T.S. Eliot
- Louise Holland (1893–1990), academic, philologist and archaeologist, taught here from 1957 to 1964
- Daphne Lamothe, provost and professor of Africana studies
- Yusef Abdul Lateef, an American jazz multi-instrumentalist and composer, thought to be one of the most influential musicians of the 20th century, taught at Smith during the early 2000s.
- Sylvia Plath (1932–1963), an American poet and erudite, was an English professor from 1957 to 1958.
- Kurt Vonnegut, served as Writer-in-Residence during the 2000–2001 school year
- Jane Zielonko, translator of The Captive Mind (1953), taught English at Smith from 1946.

In 1960, three Smith professors, one who had been there for 38 years, were fired or "allowed to retire" for being gay. This was chronicled in a book (The Scarlet Professor—Newton Arvin: A Literary Life Shattered by Scandal (Doubleday, 2001), by Barry Werth), and the PBS Independent Lens film, The Great Pink Scare. It was also depicted in an opera based on Werth's book in 2017 at Amherst College. In 2002, Smith acknowledged a wrong from four decades earlier by creating a lecture series and a small scholarship—the $100,000 Dorius/Spofford Fund for the Study of Civil Liberties and Freedom of Expression, and the Newton Arvin Prize in American Studies, a $500 annual stipend. But despite faculty appeals, there was no apology.

== See also ==
- Cambridge School of Architecture and Landscape Architecture
- College Archives (Smith College)
- Smith College commencement controversies
- SS Smith Victory – a cargo ship named after Smith College
- Tofu Curtain

== Bibliography ==
- Horowitz, Helen Lefkowitz (1993). Alma Mater: Design and Experience in the Women's Colleges from Their Nineteenth-Century Beginnings to the 1930s (2nd ed.—link is to the 1st ed.). Amherst, Mass.: Univ. of Massachusetts Press. ISBN 9780870238697. OCLC 28063894.
- Olsen, Deborah M. (Winter 2000). "Remaking the Image: Promotional Literature of Mount Holyoke, Smith, and Wellesley Colleges in the Mid-to-Late 1940s". History of Education Quarterly 40#4, pp. 418–59. doi:10.2307/369724. JSTOR 369724.
- Solomon, Barbara Miller (1985). In the Company of Educated Women: A History of Women and Higher Education in America. New Haven, Conn.: Yale University Press.
