= Daphne Lamothe =

American academic

Academic background
- Education: Yale University; University of California, Berkeley

Academic work
- Discipline: Africana studies
- Institutions: Smith College

Daphne Mary Lamothe is an American academic administrator and professor of Africana studies. She is the provost and dean of faculty at Smith College.

== Life ==
Lamothe earned a bachelor's degree in English from Yale College. She completed a Ph.D. in English at the University of California, Berkeley.

In 2004, Lamothe joined the faculty at Smith College. She is a professor of Africana studies and researches the Harlem Renaissance, the Great Migration, African-American music, and African-American literature. In May 2024, she was named as the incoming provost and dean of faculty, set to begin on July 1.

== Selected works ==
- Lamothe, Daphne Mary (2008). Inventing the New Negro: Narrative, Culture, and Ethnography. University of Pennsylvania Press. ISBN 978-0-8122-4093-1.
- Lamothe, Daphne (2024). Black Time and the Aesthetic Possibility of Objects. University of North Carolina Press. ISBN 978-1-4696-7530-5.
