= Disappearance of Alice Corbett =

1925 American missing person case

Alice M. Corbett
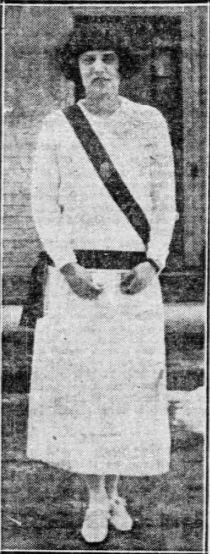
- Corbett's photo from The Boston Globe of 16 November 1925
- Born: Alice M. Corbett; March 3, 1905; Utica, New York, U.S.
- Disappeared: November 13, 1925 (age 20/21); Northampton, Massachusetts, U.S.
- Status: Missing for 101 years and 5 days
- Parents: James H. Corbett (father); Emma Corbett (mother)

Alice M. Corbett (born March 3, 1905 — disappeared November 13, 1925) was an American woman who went missing in 1925 from her residence hall at Smith College in Northampton, Massachusetts. Her case remains unsolved.

== Background ==
Born and raised in Utica, New York, Alice Corbett was a junior-year student in good academic standing at the time she disappeared.

Early on the morning of Friday, November 13, Jean M. Robeson, a fellow student and friend of Corbett, was found dead in the Park House dormitory kitchen as a result of accidental asphyxiation from cooking gas. Later, at about 8 a.m., Corbett was observed leaving her room in the Clark House dormitory. When she failed to return later that afternoon, friends entered her quarters and discovered a note in Corbett's handwriting. College officials examined the note and reported that it contained the line "Mother, I am going home" and included content indicating that Corbett was in a "confused" state of mind. Corbett's father, James, showed the note to a physician who determined that she may have been suffering from mental illness at the time she disappeared.

Before her disappearance, Corbett was dating Thomas Sterling, a student at nearby Amherst College. Sterling reported to police that Corbett asked him to buy her poison a week before she disappeared. He refused the request. Police also examined letters exchanged by Corbett and Sterling indicating they recently quarreled. In December, Sterling was cleared of any involvement in Corbett's disappearance.

Corbett was last seen wearing a dark dress and hat and a distinctive yellow raincoat. She was believed to be carrying $75 in cash, equivalent to $1,377 in 2025. She was described as being 20 or 21 years old, 5 feet 7 inches (170 cm) tall and weighing 111 or 112 pounds (50 or 51 kg), with brown or dark hair and grey or blue eyes.

== Investigation ==
On the day Corbett was reported missing, college staff and students searched the campus. The following day, the Massachusetts State Police and local Boy Scouts conducted ground searches in the area including Mount Tom in nearby Holyoke, where Corbett reportedly enjoyed hiking. James Corbett posted a $500 reward (equivalent to $9,179 in 2025) for information leading to her discovery, and local radio stations in Springfield, Massachusetts, and Schenectady, New York, broadcast her description.

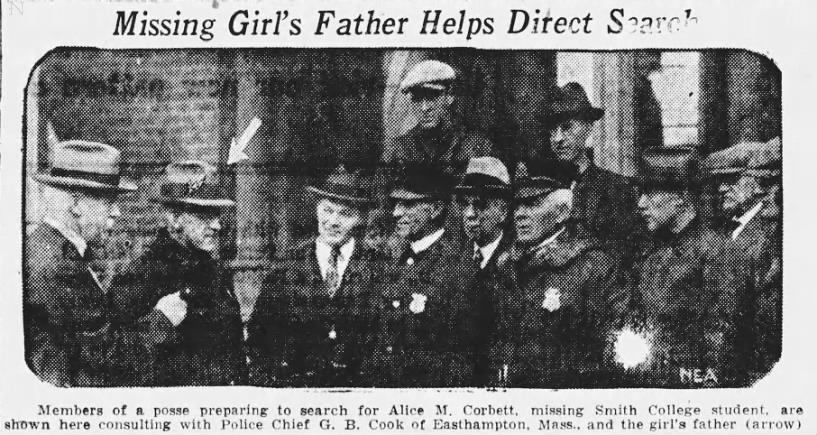
Searchers for Corbett, as published on November 19, 1925

In the weeks that followed, police investigated numerous reports from witnesses in nearby communities. A druggist believed he saw Corbett on the morning of the 13th and stated that she had inquired about the local trolley schedule. Trolley crews, however, stated that no woman resembling Corbett had ridden the line that day. Witnesses in Easthampton and Westfield, Massachusetts, reported seeing a young woman resembling Corbett who wore a yellow rain slicker. One week after Mount Tom was searched, a witness claimed to have seen Corbett hiking in the area, spurring an additional search of the site.

On November 20, telephone linemen working on Whiting Peak near Mount Tom reported being held at gunpoint by a young woman resembling Corbett who demanded food and then escaped into the woods. In early December, a resident came forward claiming to have seen a girl "wearing a yellow slicker" walking down an embankment toward the Connecticut River in Hadley, Massachusetts, around the time of Corbett's disappearance. Police linked this report with an earlier sighting of a yellow slicker floating on the same area of the river. On December 13, State Police Detective Joseph V. Daley said he believed Corbett had "wandered away" and was dead.

Widespread publicity of the case also produced false reports and hoaxes. In December 1925, police and newspapers reported receiving "many" crank letters about the case. In March 1926, a resident of Troy, New York, twice tried to collect a reward by claiming a housemaid employed at his boarding house was Corbett. In April, a middle-aged woman turned herself in to the police at Cheshire, Massachusetts, claiming to be Corbett. In May, a message in a bottle purportedly written by Corbett was retrieved from the Connecticut River near Northampton, Massachusetts. The note indicated that Corbett was being held captive in caves near Smith's Ferry. While police believed the event to be a hoax, they searched the area but discovered no new evidence.

Searches of urban areas, woodlands, and waterways in western Massachusetts continued throughout the spring and summer of 1926. In January, James Corbett enlisted the help of a boatman to search the Connecticut River and in July as canals at various mills in and around Northampton were drained for annual maintenance, a search was made for Corbett's body and clothing. In October 1927, James renewed search efforts of wilderness areas by publicizing a $1000 reward (equivalent to $18,534 in 2025) at the opening of hunting season.

== Aftermath ==
Interest in the Corbett case was revived in 1928 when Frances Smith, another student at Smith College, vanished from her residence on campus on January 13. In March 1929, Smith's body was recovered from the Connecticut River near Longmeadow, but no official cause of death was reported.

In 1933, a man from New York City confessed to killing Corbett while living in Hadley in 1925. He later recanted, and following an investigation, police dismissed his confession as false.

In 1936, human bones discovered in a shallow grave in Northampton were suspected to be Corbett's, but were identified as historic Native American remains.

== See also ==
- List of people who disappeared mysteriously: 1910–1990
- Frances Smith (missing person), who also disappeared from Smith College, in 1928
