= Inez Whipple Wilder =

American zoologist

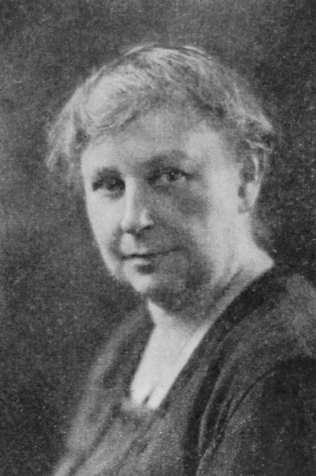
- Born: Inez Luanne Whipple; May 19, 1871; Cumberland, Rhode Island, US
- Died: April 29, 1929 (aged 57); Northampton, Massachusetts, US
- Education: Brown University (Ph.B., 1900); Rhode Island Normal School (1890)
- Spouse: Harris H. Wilder (m. 1906; died 1928)
- Scientific career
- Fields: Herpetology, Comparative anatomy
- Workplaces: Smith College

Inez Whipple Wilder (May 19, 1871 – April 29, 1929), born Inez Luanne Whipple, was an American herpetologist and anatomist, affiliated with Smith College from 1902 until her death. She made notable contributions to the study of fingerprints and the biology of salamanders.

== Early life and education ==
Wilder was born on May 19, 1871, at Diamond Hill, Cumberland, Rhode Island, the third and youngest child of parents Eliab Daniel and Sarah Whipple (née Wheaton). She graduated from Rhode Island Normal School (now Rhode Island College) in 1890, and earned a Ph.B. at Brown University in 1900. She then taught at Rhode Island Normal School and Northampton High School until joining the faculty of Smith College in 1902 as instructor of zoology. She earned her M.A. from Smith College in 1904, and became associate professor in 1914 and full professor in 1922.

== Career ==
In 1904 Inez published an influential study on the skin of mammalian palms and feet, describing how embryonic pads influence later ridges and patterns, now known as an important early contribution to dermatoglyphics, the study of fingerprints. Her paper, entitled "The Ventral Surface of the Mammalian Chiridium: With Special Reference to the Conditions Found in Man", summarized all prior knowledge of the field of genetics and dermatoglyphics, and was the most significant study of ridges in non-human animals of its time. At the time she was a research assistant of Harris Hawthorne Wilder, and on July 26, 1906, the two were married in Boston. Harris Wilder published widely on anatomy, genetics, and anthropology, and the two were known as the most prominent American researchers of fingerprint morphology of the early 20th century. Inez' 1914 book Laboratory Studies in Mammalian Anatomy was widely used, and a second edition was published in 1923.

The Wilders also assembled what was at the time the most active research program in salamander biology in the world, later joined by Emmett R. Dunn. While Harris and Inez both studied salamanders, they worked independently and never published together. Inez was the first to name and describe the function of nasolabial grooves, olfactory structures found plethodontid salamanders (also known as lungless salamanders). Later, with Dunn she proposed an explanation for the evolutionary loss of lungs in plethodontids (a trait which her husband had discovered). She studied the salamanders Desmognathus fuscus and Eurycea bislineata in depth, and published in total 13 papers on salamander biology. In 1925 she published The Morphology of Amphibian Metamorphosis, a book in which she describes the comparative biology of D. fuscus, E. bislineata, and the newt Notophthalmus viridescens.

== Later life ==
Her husband died in February, 1928, after which she became chair of the Smith College Department of Zoology. After a long illness, Inez Wilder died at Northampton on April 29, 1929, aged 57. Shortly before her death she completed editing her husband's autobiography. Wilder House, a residential house at Smith College, was named in honor of her and her husband in 1930. She is also commemorated in the name of the Blue Ridge two-lined salamander, Eurycea wilderae.

== Books ==
- Laboratory Studies in Mammalian Anatomy, P. Blakiston's Son & Co., 1914
- The Morphology of Amphibian Metamorphosis, Smith College, 1925
- Editor: The Early Years of a Zoölogist: The Story of a New England Boyhood, Smith College, 1930
