= Halina Poświatowska =

Polish poet and writer (1935–1967)

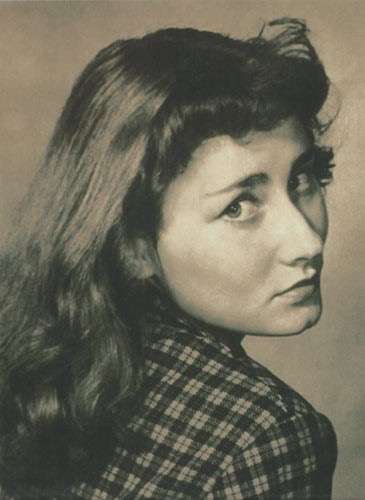
- Poświatowska, circa 1954-1956
- Born: 9 May 1935; Częstochowa, Kielce Vovoideship, Second Polish Republic
- Died: 11 October 1967 (aged 32); Warsaw, Polish People's Republic
- Occupations: Poet, student of logic and philosophy
- Writing career
- Pen name: Haśka (more of an intimate diminutive form of Halina, used by her and those around her, rather than a true pseudonym)
- Genre: Lyric
- Literary movement: 20th-century Polish post-WWII poetry

Halina Poświatowska (Polish: [Pɔɕviatɔvska]; née Halina Myga, entered into church records as Helena Myga; born 9 May 1935 – 11 October 1967) was a Polish poet and writer.

Poświatowska is famous for her lyrical poetry, and for her intellectual, passionate yet unsentimental poetry on the themes of death, love, existence, famous historical personages, especially women, as well as her mordant treatment of life, living, being, bees, cats and the sensual qualities of loving, grieving and desiring.

== Biography ==
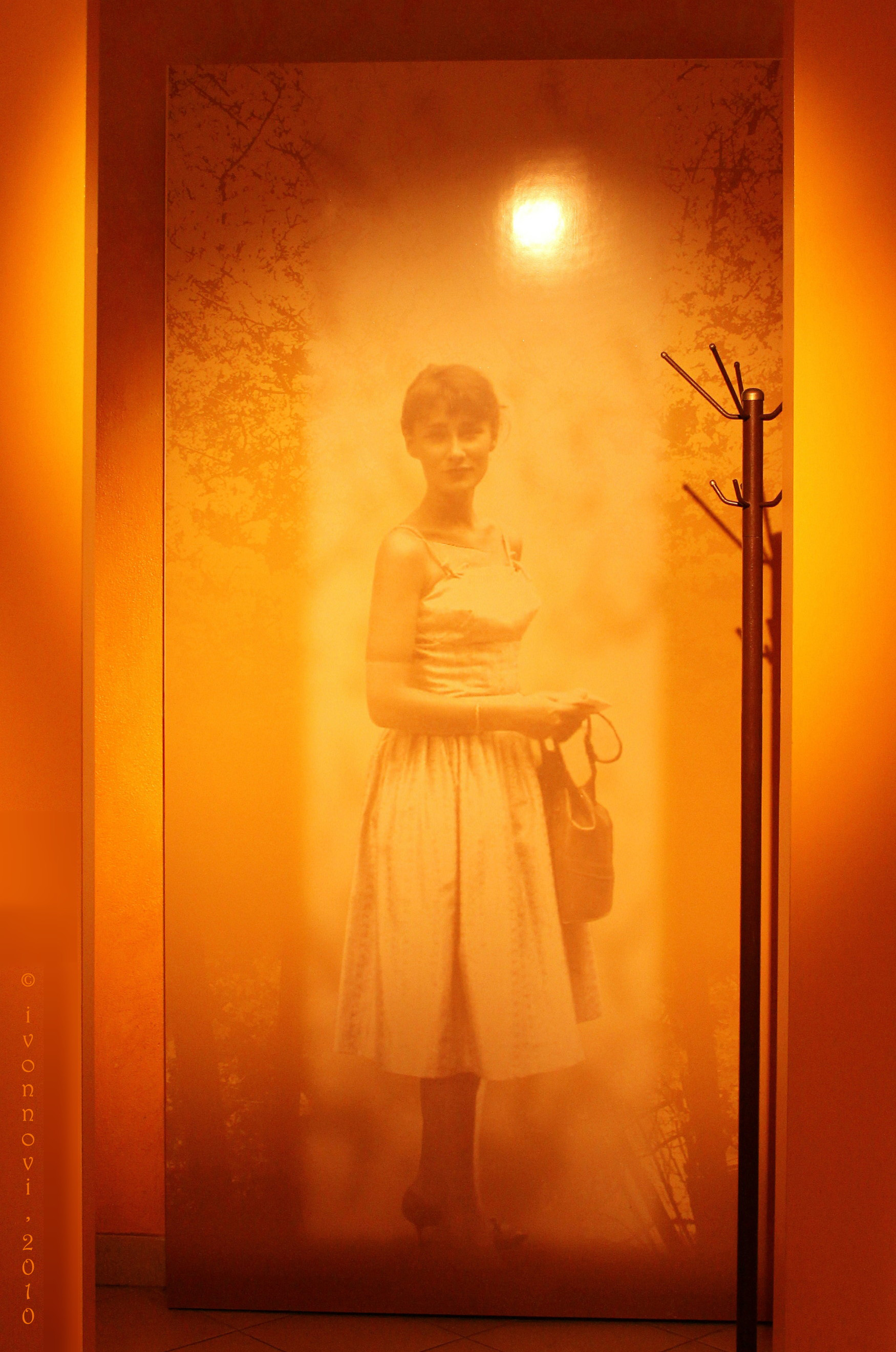
Picture of the poet at her museum in Częstochowa, fot. Ivonna Nowicka

Her first heart operation was performed in Philadelphia, in 1958, her sea passage on the Polish ocean liner MS Batory, the costs of her stay, and the procedure itself, funded by monies gathered in collection by Polish-Americans, and was successful enough to enable her to live for nine more years. Instead of returning to Poland afterward, she enrolled at Smith College in Northampton, Massachusetts, where she completed her undergraduate studies in 3 years, commencing with no command of the English language whatsoever. Then, turning down an offer of graduate admission with full financial support, extended to her by the faculty of Stanford University's Department of Philosophy, she returned to Poland, where she matriculated in Philosophy at the Jagellonian University, Kraków, and died before continuing on to complete the doctorate, as a 4th year student.

She died at 32 after a second heart operation, this time, performed in Poland, to correct an acquired chronic heart defect that limited her mobility and breathing, which befell her due to chronic chill as a 9-year-old child during the World War II German occupation of Poland.

== Works ==
- Hymn bałwochwalczy (1958)
- Opowieść dla przyjaciela (1967, prose)
- "Tańcząca Nina" [p. 19 in Wiersze wybrane, Jan Zych, ed.]
- "***('my nie wierzymy w piekło...')" [22]
- "***('Jestem Julią...') [35]
- ***('codziennie')" [352]
- "W przestrzeni i czasie" [400]
- "***('Kiedy Izolda umierała...')" [422]
- Bajka o sówce, która w dzień spać lubiła (a 10-page poem fable in strict rhyme)

== Literary heritage ==
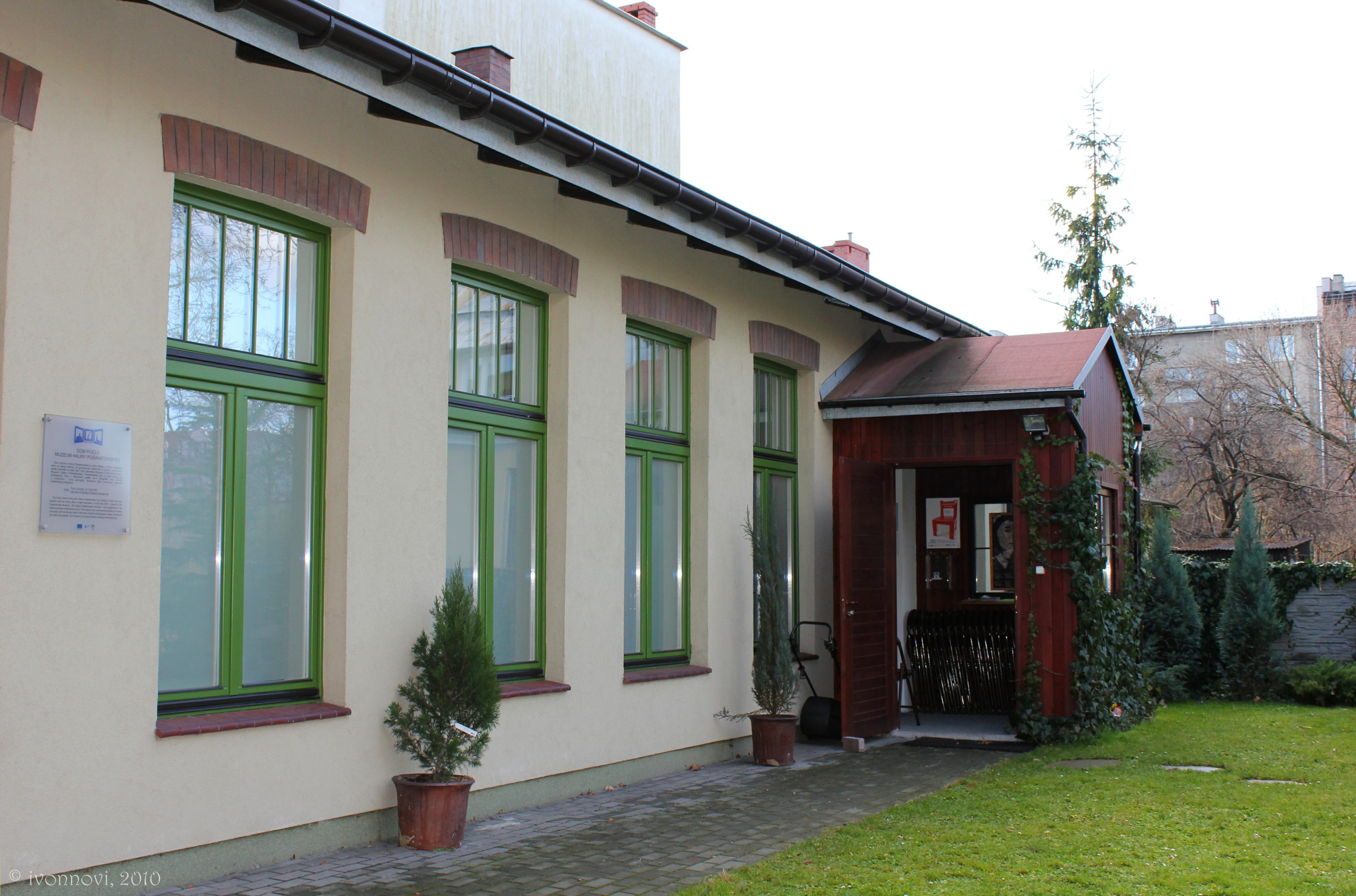
The Poetry House - Museum of Halina Poświatowska in Częstochowa, fot. Ivonna Nowicka

Her works have been collected in the four-volume Dzieła (Works), published by Wydawnictwo Literackie, Kraków, Poland, 1997, of which the first two volumes (several hundred pages) are poems, and the latter two prose and letters, respectively. She is the subject of several scholarly books and many reprints. Her popularity as a poet continues unabated in Poland, and new translations have increased her importance to world literature. If her own poem content, as well as her own poetry translations are any indication, she was influenced by Ezra Pound, Lawrence Ferlinghetti, Federico García Lorca, Jacques Prévert, and a bevy of Slovene poets: Kajetan Kovič, Jože Udovič, Saša Vegri, Dane Zajc, as well as the classical Greek philosopher Aristotle, bees, cats, the color red, the texture of fur, Metropolitan Museum of Art's antiquity collections, and her contemporary Black American (Negro) city culture – in particular, the people of New York City, in Harlem.

== Notable translations (ad hoc collections) ==
=== Books and journals ===
- Halina Poświatowska. "Mais uma lembrança/Jeszcze jedno wspomnienie/". (n.t.) Revista Literária em Tradução, nº 1 (Set/2010) (in Portuguese). Magdalena Nowinska (Translator). Fpolis/Brasil. ISSN 2177-5141. (in Portuguese)
- Ey zendegi tarkam koni mimiram. Gozine-ye ash'ar = Życie, umrę jeśli odejdziesz. Wybór wierszy, [trans. into the Persian] Alireza Doulatshahi, Ivonna Nowicka. Baal Publications, Tehran-Iran 2010, 93 p. ISBN 978-964-2574-28-5 (in Persian)
- Indeed I love..., selected and transl. into the English by Maya Peretz, afterword by Anna Nasiłowska. Wydawnictwo Literackie, Kraków 1998, 2005, 233 pp. (in English)
- Mon ombre est une femme, poèmes trad. du pol. par Isabelle Macor-Filarska et Grzegorz Splawinski. Éditions Caractères, Paris 2004, 100 p. (in French)
- Racconto per un amico, trad. dal pol. di Vera Verdiani. Neri Pozza Editore, Vicenza dr. 2001, 175 p. (in Italian)
- Oiseau de mon coeur..., choix et traduction Isabelle Macor-Filarska, Grzegorz Spławiński, postface Izolda Kiec. Wydawnictwo Literackie, Kraków 1998, 163 p. (in French)
- Ošče edin spomen : poezija, proza, prev. ot pol. Zdravko Kis'ov, Blagovesta Lingorska. Karina M., Sofija 1997, 253 p. (in Bulgarian)

=== Unpublished/Internet ===
- Halina Poswiatowska. "HalinaFAQ: Complete Canon of Halina Poświatowska Poetry in Translation from the Polish into the Contemporary American-English" (in English and Polish). Marek Lugowski (Translator, Maintainer, PHP Programmer), Sheila Miguez (PHP Programmer). Archived from the original on 14 December 2015. (in English and Polish)
