= Luma Mufleh =

Jordanian-American activist and author

Luma Mufleh (born March 1, 1979) is founder and director of Fugees Family, Inc., ("The Fugees") a non-profit organization devoted to working with child survivors of war.

== Early life ==
Luma Mufleh was born in Amman, Jordan to an affluent family. She left Jordan to attend Smith College in Northampton, Massachusetts in 1993. Mufleh graduated from Smith in 1997 with a B.A. in anthropology. She moved from Northampton to Boston to North Carolina to Atlanta, while working as a waitress, cook, grocery stock clerk, an office worker for a charity, and a freelance website designer. After she arrived in Atlanta, she started Ashton's, a coffee shop and café, and coached girls' soccer before founding the Fugees Family in 2006.

== Fugees Family ==
Fugees Family, Inc. ("The Fugees") is a non-profit organization devoted to working with child survivors of war. The Fugees was cofounded by Luma Mufleh and Tracy Edigar, the chief operating officer who directs all volunteers and educational activities for Fugees programs. The Fugees program has 86 refugee boys and girls ages 11–18 who attend twice-weekly soccer practices, play games on weekends, and participate in tournaments. Fugees Family has an after-school tutoring program, a 57-student middle school called Fugees Academy, and ongoing community events like car washes and group meals. The Fugees sign a strict contract outlining the rules for maintaining membership in the program.

The Fugees are from over 24 war-torn countries around the world, such as Burma, Bosnia, Afghanistan, Iraq, Cuba, Sudan, Somalia, Democratic Republic of the Congo, and Eritrea. The Fugees are located in Clarkston, Georgia, a city of about 7,000 people a few miles outside of Atlanta. Over 61,000 refugees have been resettled in Georgia since 1981, with 2,824 arriving in 2008. Clarkston was chosen as a site for refugee resettlement due to its access to public transportation, cheap and plentiful housing, and proximity to Atlanta. Although not without controversy, the Fugees have been recognized for their efforts at fostering diversity, tolerance, and community building among both refugees as well as local residents of Clarkston and its surrounding neighborhoods.

== Awards ==
Mufleh was the CNN Hero of the Year in 2017, and was awarded the Dianne Von Furstenburg's Peoples Choice award in 2018.

Mufleh is the recipient of the Martin Luther King Jr. Community Service Award, the Smith College Medal, and the Common Ground Award which is presented annually to honor accomplishments in conflict resolution, negotiation, community building, and peacebuilding. She also received the Foreign Language Advocacy Award in 2009 from the Northeast Conference on the Teaching of Foreign Languages for her commitment to the integration of refugees in the U.S.

She has appeared on CNN, Today, CBS, and ESPN and as a commencement speaker. Mufleh has also been featured in The New York Times, NPR, and Sports Illustrated.

In 2009, the Fugees were the subject of a book by Warren St. John, Outcasts United: A Refugee Team, an American Town.

== See also ==
- Community organizing
