= Rosa Orellana =

American mathematician

Rosa C. Orellana is an American mathematician specializing in algebraic combinatorics and representation theory. She is a professor of mathematics at Dartmouth College.

== Early life and education ==
Orellana's excitement for mathematics was recognized early, by one of her elementary school teachers. She is a graduate of California State University, Los Angeles, and was the first in her family to earn a college degree. Her undergraduate education also included summer research with Kenneth Millett at the University of California, Santa Barbara on knot theory and its applications to biomolecules.

She completed her Ph.D. in 1999 at the University of California, San Diego. Originally intending to continue her study of knot theory, she shifted to algebraic combinatorics after the knot theorist she planned to work with went on leave. Her dissertation, The Hecke Algebra of Type B at Roots of Unity, Markov Traces and Subfactors, was supervised by Hans Wenzl.

== Career ==
After completing her doctorate, Orellana became a postdoctoral researcher at the University of California, San Diego, supported by a University of California President's Postdoctoral Fellowship, before joining Dartmouth as a Wilson Foundation Fellow in 2000.

At Dartmouth, she won the John M. Manley Huntington Memorial Award for outstanding research by a newly tenured faculty member, helped found the Dartmouth chapter of the Association for Women in Mathematics, and founded a sequence of Sonia Kovalevsky Math days to encourage local school girls to continue in mathematics. She serves on the Scientific Advisory Board for the Institute for Computational and Experimental Research in Mathematics (ICERM).

Orellana was a former Council member at large for the American Mathematical Society (AMS) from 2020 to 2022.
