= Christine Heitsch =

Mathematician

Christine Elizabeth Heitsch is a mathematician whose research involves the biomolecular structure of RNA. She is a professor of mathematics in the Georgia Tech School of Mathematics, and the founding director of the Southeast Center for Mathematics and Biology at Georgia Tech.

== Education and career ==
Heitsch graduated in 1994 from the University of Illinois at Urbana–Champaign, magna cum laude and Phi Beta Kappa, with a bachelor's degree in mathematics. She completed her Ph.D. at the University of California, Berkeley in 2000. Her dissertation, Computational Complexity of Generalized Pattern Matching, was jointly supervised by John Rhodes and John R. Stallings.

After postdoctoral research at the University of British Columbia and the University of Wisconsin–Madison, she joined the Georgia Tech faculty in 2006, and was promoted to full professor in 2016. At Georgia Tech, as well as being a professor of mathematics, she also holds courtesy appointments in the School of Computational Science & Engineering, and in the School of Biology.

== Recognition ==
In 2019 the University of Illinois Department of Mathematics gave Heitsch their annual Alumni Award for Outstanding Professional Achievement.
