= Alison Cheek =

Australian-born American religious leader (1927–2019)

The Reverend Alison Cheek
- Born: Alison Mary Western; April 11, 1927; Adelaide, South Australia
- Died: September 1, 2019 (aged 92); Brevard, North Carolina, U.S.
- Education: Virginia Theological Seminary; Episcopal Divinity School
- Children: 4
- Religion: Christianity
- Church: Episcopal Church
- Ordained: January 29, 1972 (diaconate); July 29, 1974 (presbyterate)

Alison Mary Cheek (April 11, 1927 – September 1, 2019) was an Australian-born American religious leader. She was one of the first women ordained in the Episcopal Church in the United States and the first woman to publicly celebrate the Eucharist in that denomination.

== Early life and education ==
Alison Mary Western was born on April 11, 1927 in Adelaide, South Australia to Hedley and Dora (Whiting) Western. Her father was a fruit farmer, and her mother was a homemaker. Western graduated from the University of Adelaide in 1947 and married her economics tutor, Bruce Cheek. The couple moved to Boston for his fellowship at Harvard University and then back to Australia two years later. They returned to the United States in 1957 when Cheek's husband was hired by the World Bank in Washington, D.C. Cheek became a lay minister at several churches in the area.

Cheek had become active as a lay leader at St. Alban's Episcopal Church in Annandale, Virginia, when her rector encouraged her to take some classes at Virginia Theological Seminary because she was increasingly being asked to lead programs at the church. In 1963, she was one of the first two women admitted into the school's Master of Divinity program, graduating in 1969. Although she was not seeking ordination when she enrolled, she suddenly felt a call to become a priest while on a retreat. With four young children at home, her bishop dissuaded her from considering ordination, and it took her six years to complete her degree part-time.

== Path to ordination as an Episcopal priest ==
Following graduation from the seminary, she was hired as a lay minister at Christ Church in Alexandria, where she was in charge of pastoral ministry and allowed to preach a few times. She then began training and working with the Pastoral Counseling and Consulting Centers of Greater Washington and the Washington Institute for Pastoral Psychotherapy, returning to St. Alban's to continue pastoral ministry as a laywoman. Eventually, however, her rector encouraged her to enter the ordination process in the Diocese of Virginia, and she was ordained as the first woman deacon in the South on January 29, 1972.

When the House of Deputies voted against women's ordination in 1973, Cheek was motivated to work with other women and supporters to change the church's mind. On July 29, 1974, she and 10 other women were ordained at the Church of the Advocate in Philadelphia, and in August she was installed as assistant priest at the Church of St. Stephen and the Incarnation in Washington. On November 10, 1974, Cheek became the first woman to celebrate the Eucharist in an Episcopal church, in defiance of the diocesan bishop.

Time magazine named her as one of 1975 twelve Women of the Year for her advocacy and action on behalf of women's ordination. She appeared on the cover in clerical dress.

During the 1970s, Cheek studied at the Washington Institute of Pastoral Psychotherapy and opened her own counseling practice. After Cheek's husband died in 1977, she became a priest at Trinity Memorial Church in Philadelphia, where she also co-directed a Venture in Mission fundraising program. Cheek later attended at the Episcopal Divinity School in Cambridge, Massachusetts, where she was hired as the Director of Feminist Liberation Studies in 1989 and earned her D.Min. degree in 1990.

In 1996, Cheek joined the Greenfire Community and Retreat Center in Tenants Harbor, Maine, where she served as a facilitator, teacher, and counselor, and later became active with St. Peter's Episcopal Church in Rockland.

In 2013, Cheek retired, moving to North Carolina.

== Activism ==
Cheek was active in the movement for female priests in Australia. She also became active in marginalized groups such as the gay movement, black movement, and women in poverty, sticking to the margins of the church to exercise her ministry.

== Death ==
Cheek died at her home in Brevard, North Carolina, on September 1, 2019.

== See also ==
- Philadelphia Eleven
