= November 22 =

November 22 this year in various calendars
- Sunday, 22 November 2026
Akan	Kurukwasi
Armenian	5 Kʿaloch 1476
Aztec	Tlacaxipehualiztli 11, 5 Cuetzpalin
Babylonian	11 Arakhsamna, 2337 SE
Balinese pawukon	Menga, Pasah, Laba, Pon, Paniron, Redite of Kulantir, Brahma, Dangu, Suka
Bengali	7 Ogrohayon, BS 1433
Chinese	Yang Metal Rat・Emptiness Mansion; Fire Horse Year, Month 10, Day 14 (Xiaoxue, 15 days until Daxue)
Common Era	22 November 2026 CE
Coptic	13 Hathor, AM 1743
Egyptian	10 Pharmuthi, 2775 NE
Ethiopian	13 H̱edār, 2019 Amätä Məhrät
French Republican	Décade I, Primidi de Frimaire de l'Année 235 de la République
Gregorian	22 November, AD 2026
Hebrew	12 Kislev, AM 5787
Hindu	Aśvinī・Siddhi; Solar: 6 Mārgaśīrṣa, 1948 SE; Lunisolar: Trayodaśī, Śukla pakṣa of Kārtika, 2083 VE; Rāudra・5127 KY・1,872,901
Icelandic	Sunnudagur, 30 Gormánuður 2026
Islamic	11 Jumada al-thani, AH 1448 (using tabular method)
ISO week date	2026-W47-7
Japanese	14 Kannazuki, Reiwa 8 (Shōsetsu, 15 days until Taisetsu)
Julian	9 November, AD 2026 (AM 7535)
Julian day	2461367
Korean	14 Dwaejidal, 4359 DE
Maya	13.0.14.2.4; 17 Ceh, 5 Kan
Roman	ante diem V Idus Novembres, MMDCCLXXIX AUC
Solar Hijri	1 Azar, SH 1405
Tibetan	13 smin drug, me pho rta 2153 or 1772 or 1000

<<	November					>>
Su	Mo	Tu	We	Th	Fr	Sa
1	2	3	4	5	6	7
8	9	10	11	12	13	14
15	16	17	18	19	20	21
22	23	24	25	26	27	28
29	30
2026

November 22 in recent years
2026 (Sunday)
2025 (Saturday)
2024 (Friday)
2023 (Wednesday)
2022 (Tuesday)
2021 (Monday)
2020 (Sunday)
2019 (Friday)
2018 (Thursday)
2017 (Wednesday)

November 22 is the 326th day of the year (327th in leap years) in the Gregorian calendar; 39 days remain until the end of the year.

== Events ==
=== Pre-1600 ===
- 498 – After the death of Anastasius II, Symmachus is elected Pope in the Lateran Palace, while Laurentius is elected Pope in Santa Maria Maggiore.
- 545 – During the Three-Chapter Controversy, Pope Vigilius is abducted on order of emperor Justinian I in order to force him to agree with Byzantine imperial religious policy.
- 602 – Emperor Maurice loses control over Constantinople and flees the city.
- 845 – The first duke of Brittany, Nominoe, defeats the Frankish king Charles the Bald at the Battle of Ballon near Redon.
- 1210 – The Castle of Termes falls to Simon de Montfort after a four-month siege during the Albigensian Crusade.
- 1220 – Frederick II is crowned Holy Roman Emperor in Rome by Pope Honorius III.
- 1307 – Pope Clement V issues the papal bull Pastoralis Praeeminentiae which instructed all Christian monarchs in Europe to arrest all Templars and seize their assets.
- 1574 – Spanish navigator Juan Fernández discovers islands now known as the Juan Fernández Islands off Chile.

=== 1601–1900 ===
- 1635 – Dutch colonial forces on Taiwan launch a pacification campaign against native villages, resulting in Dutch control of the middle and south of the island.
- 1718 – Royal Navy Lieutenant Robert Maynard attacks and boards the vessels of the British pirate Edward Teach (best known as "Blackbeard") off the coast of North Carolina. The casualties on both sides include Maynard's first officer Mister Hyde and Teach himself.
- 1837 – Canadian journalist and politician William Lyon Mackenzie calls for a rebellion against the United Kingdom in his essay "To the People of Upper Canada", published in his newspaper The Constitution.
- 1855 – In Birmingham, England, Albert, Prince Consort lays the foundation stone of the Birmingham and Midland Institute.
- 1869 – In Dumbarton, Scotland, the clipper Cutty Sark is launched.
- 1873 – The French steamer SS Ville du Havre sinks in 12 minutes after colliding with the Scottish iron clipper Loch Earn in the Atlantic, with a loss of 226 lives.

=== 1901–present ===
- 1908 – The Congress of Manastir establishes the Albanian alphabet.
- 1921 – During The Troubles in Ulster (1920–1922), 15 Irish Nationalists are killed in Belfast in one day.
- 1935 – The China Clipper inaugurates the first commercial transpacific air service, connecting Alameda, California with Manila.
- 1940 – World War II: Following the initial Italian invasion, Greek troops counterattack into Italian-occupied Albania and capture Korytsa.
- 1942 – World War II: Battle of Stalingrad: General Friedrich Paulus sends Adolf Hitler a telegram saying that the German 6th Army is surrounded.
- 1943 – World War II: Cairo Conference: U.S. President Franklin D. Roosevelt, British Prime Minister Winston Churchill, and Chinese Premier Chiang Kai-shek meet in Cairo, Egypt, to discuss ways to defeat Japan.
- 1943 – Lebanon gains independence from France, nearly two years after it was first announced by the Free French government.
- 1952 – A Douglas C-124 Globemaster II crashes into Mount Gannet, Alaska, killing all 52 aboard.
- 1955 – The Soviet Union launches RDS-37, a 1.6 megaton two stage hydrogen bomb designed by Andrei Sakharov. The bomb was dropped over Semipalatinsk.
- 1963 – U.S. President John F. Kennedy is assassinated and Texas Governor John Connally is seriously wounded by Lee Harvey Oswald, who also kills Dallas Police officer J. D. Tippit after fleeing the scene. Vice President Lyndon B. Johnson is sworn in as the 36th President of the United States afterwards.
- 1963 – Five Indian generals are killed in a helicopter crash, due to collision with two parallel lines of telegraph cables.
- 1967 – UN Security Council Resolution 242 is adopted, establishing a set of the principles aimed at guiding negotiations for an Arab–Israeli peace settlement.
- 1968 – Japan Air Lines Flight 2 accidentally ditches in San Francisco Bay while on approach to San Francisco International Airport. No one is injured.
- 1971 – In Britain's worst mountaineering tragedy, the Cairngorm Plateau Disaster, five children and one of their leaders are found dead from exposure in the Scottish mountains.
- 1975 – Juan Carlos is declared King of Spain following the death of Francisco Franco two days earlier.
- 1987 – The Max Headroom signal hijacking incident takes place, in which a pirate broadcast interrupts television broadcasts in Chicago.
- 1989 – NASA launches Space Shuttle Discovery on STS-33, a classified mission for the United States Department of Defense.
- 1990 – British Prime Minister Margaret Thatcher withdraws from the Conservative Party leadership election, confirming the end of her Premiership.
- 1994 – A Trans World Airlines McDonnell Douglas MD-80 and Cessna 441 Conquest II aircraft collide on the runway at St. Louis Lambert International Airport in Bridgeton, Missouri, killing two people and injuring eight.
- 2003 – Baghdad DHL attempted shootdown incident: Shortly after takeoff, a DHL Express cargo plane is struck on the left wing by a surface-to-air missile and forced to land.
- 2004 – The Orange Revolution begins in Ukraine, resulting from the presidential elections.
- 2010 – During the Cambodian water festival, a stampede in Koh Pich, Phnom Penh, kills 347 people.
- 2014 – While playing with a toy gun in Cleveland, 12-year-old African American Tamir Rice is killed by a white police officer.
- 2022 – A shooting at a Walmart in Chesapeake, Virginia leaves seven workers dead, including the shooter, and four others injured.

== Births ==
=== Pre-1600 ===
- 1428 – Richard Neville, 16th Earl of Warwick, English nobleman, known as "the Kingmaker" (died 1471)
- 1515 – Mary of Guise, Queen of Scots (died 1560)
- 1519 – Johannes Crato von Krafftheim, German humanist and physician (died 1585)
- 1533 – Alfonso II d'Este, Duke of Ferrara, Italian noble (died 1597)
- 1564 – Henry Brooke, 11th Baron Cobham, English politician, Lord Lieutenant of Kent (died 1619)

=== 1601–1900 ===
- 1602 – Elisabeth of France (died 1644)
- 1635 – Francis Willughby, English ornithologist and ichthyologist (died 1672)
- 1643 – René-Robert Cavelier, Sieur de La Salle, French explorer (died 1687)
- 1690 – François Colin de Blamont, French composer (died 1760)
- 1698 – Pierre de Rigaud, Marquis de Vaudreuil-Cavagnial, Canadian-American politician, Governor of Louisiana (died 1778)
- 1710 – Wilhelm Friedemann Bach, German composer (died 1784)
- 1728 – Charles Frederick, Grand Duke of Baden (died 1811)
- 1744 – Abigail Adams, American wife of John Adams, 2nd First Lady of the United States (died 1818)
- 1780 – Conradin Kreutzer, German composer (died 1849)
- 1780 – José Cecilio del Valle, Honduran journalist, lawyer, and politician, Foreign Minister of Mexico (died 1834)
- 1787 – Rasmus Rask, Danish linguist, philologist, and scholar (died 1832)
- 1808 – Thomas Cook, English businessman, founded Thomas Cook Group (died 1892)
- 1819 – George Eliot, English novelist and poet (died 1880)
- 1820 – Katherine Plunket, Irish supercentenarian (died 1932)
- 1849 – Christian Rohlfs, German painter and printmaker (died 1938)
- 1852 – Paul-Henri-Benjamin d'Estournelles de Constant, French politician and diplomat, Nobel Prize laureate (died 1924)
- 1857 – George Gissing, English novelist (died 1903)
- 1859 – Cecil Sharp, English folk song scholar (died 1924)
- 1861 – Ranavalona III of Madagascar (died 1917)
- 1861 – Cyrus Edwin Dallin, American sculptor (died 1944)
- 1868 – John Nance Garner, American politician, 32nd Vice President of the United States (died 1967)
- 1869 – André Gide, French novelist, essayist, and dramatist, Nobel Prize laureate (died 1951)
- 1870 – Howard Brockway, American composer (died 1951)
- 1870 – Harry Graham, Australian cricketer (died 1911)
- 1873 – Leo Amery, Indian-English journalist and politician, Secretary of State for the Colonies (died 1955)
- 1873 – Johnny Tyldesley, English cricketer (died 1930)
- 1876 – Emil Beyer, American gymnast and triathlete (died 1934)
- 1877 – Endre Ady, Hungarian journalist and poet (died 1919)
- 1877 – Joan Gamper, Swiss-Spanish footballer, founded FC Barcelona (died 1930)
- 1881 – Enver Pasha, Ottoman general and politician (died 1922)
- 1884 – C. J. "Jack" De Garis, Australian entrepreneur (died 1926)
- 1890 – Charles de Gaulle, French general and politician, President of France (died 1970)
- 1890 – Harry Pollitt, British politician and trade unionist, General Secretary of the Communist Party of Great Britain (died 1960)
- 1891 – Edward Bernays, American publicist (died 1995)
- 1893 – Harley Earl, American industrial designer (died 1969)
- 1893 – Lazar Kaganovich, Soviet politician (died 1991)
- 1898 – Wiley Post, American pilot (died 1935)
- 1899 – Hoagy Carmichael, American singer-songwriter, pianist, and actor (died 1981)

=== 1901–present ===
- 1901 – Béla Juhos, Hungarian-Austrian philosopher from the Vienna Circle (died 1971)
- 1901 – Joaquín Rodrigo, Spanish pianist and composer (died 1999)
- 1902 – Philippe Leclerc de Hauteclocque, French general (died 1947)
- 1902 – Emanuel Feuermann, Austrian-American cellist (died 1942)
- 1904 – Miguel Covarrubias, Mexican painter and illustrator (died 1957)
- 1904 – Louis Néel, French physicist and academic, Nobel Prize laureate (died 2000)
- 1904 – Fumio Niwa, Japanese author (died 2005)
- 1906 – Jørgen Juve, Norwegian football player and journalist (died 1983)
- 1910 – Mary Jackson, American actress (died 2005)
- 1911 – Ralph Guldahl, American golfer (died 1987)
- 1912 – Doris Duke, American heiress and philanthropist (died 1993)
- 1913 – Benjamin Britten, English pianist, composer, and conductor (died 1976)
- 1913 – Gardnar Mulloy, American tennis player (died 2016)
- 1914 – Peter Townsend, British captain and pilot (died 1995)
- 1915 – Oswald Morris, British cinematographer (died 2014)
- 1917 – Jon Cleary, Australian author and playwright (died 2010)
- 1917 – Andrew Huxley, English physiologist and biophysicist, Nobel Prize laureate (died 2012)
- 1917 – Mick Shann, Australian diplomat (died 1988)
- 1918 – Claiborne Pell, American politician (died 2009)
- 1919 – Máire Drumm, Irish politician (died 1976)
- 1920 – Anne Crawford, British actress (died 1956)
- 1920 – Baidyanath Misra, Indian economist (died 2019)
- 1921 – Brian Cleeve, Irish writer and broadcaster (died 2003)
- 1921 – Rodney Dangerfield, American comedian, actor, rapper, and screenwriter (died 2004)
- 1922 – Eugene Stoner, American engineer and weapons designer, designed the AR-15 rifle (died 1997)
- 1923 – Dennis Wrong, Canadian-born American sociologist (2018)
- 1923 – Arthur Hiller, Canadian-American director (died 2016)
- 1923 – Dika Newlin, American composer and singer (died 2006)
- 1924 – Les Johnson, Australian politician (died 2015)
- 1924 – Geraldine Page, American actress and singer (died 1987)
- 1925 – Jerrie Mock, American pilot (died 2014)
- 1925 – Gunther Schuller, American horn player, composer, and conductor (died 2015)
- 1926 – Lew Burdette, American baseball player and coach (died 2007)
- 1927 – Steven Muller, American academic administrator (died 2013)
- 1928 – Tim Beaumont, English priest and politician (died 2008)
- 1928 – Mel Hutchins, American basketball player (died 2018)
- 1929 – Staughton Lynd, American lawyer, historian, author, and activist (died 2022)
- 1930 – Peter Hall, English director (died 2017)
- 1930 – Peter Hurford, English organist and composer (died 2019)
- 1931 – Alison Palmer, American priest and diplomat
- 1932 – Robert Vaughn, American actor and director (died 2016)
- 1933 – Merv Lincoln, Australian Olympic athlete (died 2016)
- 1934 – Rita Sakellariou, Greek singer (died 1999)
- 1935 – Ludmila Belousova, Soviet ice skater (died 2017)
- 1936 – John Bird, English actor, writer and satirist (died 2022)
- 1937 – Zenon Jankowski, Polish pilot and military officer
- 1937 – Nikolai Kapustin, Soviet pianist and composer (died 2020)
- 1938 – John Eleuthère du Pont, American convicted murderer (died 2010)
- 1939 – Tom West, American technologist (died 2011)
- 1939 – Mulayam Singh Yadav, Indian politician, Indian Minister of Defence (died 2022)
- 1940 – Terry Gilliam, American-English actor, director, animator, and screenwriter
- 1940 – Roy Thomas, American author
- 1940 – Andrzej Żuławski, Polish director and screenwriter (died 2016)
- 1941 – Tom Conti, Scottish actor and director
- 1941 – Jacques Laperrière, Canadian ice hockey player and coach
- 1941 – Terry Stafford, American singer-songwriter (died 1996)
- 1941 – Jesse Colin Young, American singer-songwriter and bass player (died 2025)
- 1942 – Guion Bluford, American astronaut
- 1942 – Floyd Sneed, Canadian drummer (died 2023)
- 1943 – Yvan Cournoyer, Canadian ice hockey player
- 1943 – Billie Jean King, American tennis player
- 1943 – Mushtaq Mohammad, Pakistani cricketer
- 1945 – Buzz Potamkin, American director and producer, founded Buzzco Associates (died 2012)
- 1945 – Kari Tapio, Finnish singer (died 2010)
- 1946 – Gary Hilton, American serial killer
- 1947 – Sandy Alderson, American baseball executive
- 1947 – Rod Price, English guitarist and songwriter (died 2005)
- 1947 – Nevio Scala, Italian footballer and manager
- 1947 – Salt Walther, American race car driver (died 2012)
- 1947 – Valerie Wilson Wesley, American journalist and author
- 1948 – Radomir Antić, Serbian footballer and manager (died 2020)
- 1948 – Saroj Khan, Indian dance choreographer, known as "The Mother of Dance/Choreography in India" (died 2020)
- 1948 – Mick Rock, English photographer (died 2021)
- 1949 – Richard Carmona, American physician and politician, Surgeon General of the United States
- 1950 – Lyman Bostock, American baseball player (died 1978)
- 1950 – Jim Jefferies, Scottish footballer and manager
- 1950 – Steven Van Zandt, American singer-songwriter, guitarist, producer, and actor
- 1950 – Tina Weymouth, American singer-songwriter and bass player
- 1951 – Kent Nagano, American conductor
- 1953 – Wayne Larkins, English cricketer
- 1954 – Denise Epoté, Cameroonian journalist at the head of the Africa management of TV5 Monde
- 1954 – Paolo Gentiloni, Italian politician, Prime Minister of Italy
- 1954 – Carol Tomcala, Australian sports shooter
- 1955 – George Alagiah, British journalist (died 2023)
- 1955 – James Edwards, American basketball player
- 1956 – Lawrence Gowan, Scottish-Canadian singer-songwriter and keyboard player
- 1956 – Richard Kind, American actor
- 1957 – Donny Deutsch, American businessman and television host
- 1957 – Alan Stern, American engineer and planetary scientist
- 1958 – Jamie Lee Curtis, American actress
- 1958 – Lee Guetterman, American baseball player
- 1958 – Ibrahim Ismail of Johor, Sultan of Johor and the 17th and current Yang Di Pertuan Agong or the King of Malaysia
- 1958 – Jason Ringenberg, American singer-songwriter and guitarist
- 1959 – Frank McAvennie, Scottish footballer
- 1959 – Fabio Parra, Colombian cyclist
- 1960 – Leos Carax, French actor, director, and screenwriter
- 1961 – Mariel Hemingway, American actress
- 1961 – Stephen Hough, English-Australian pianist and composer
- 1962 – Sumi Jo, South Korean soprano
- 1962 – Victor Pelevin, Russian author
- 1963 – Hugh Millen, American football player
- 1963 – Tony Mowbray, English footballer and manager
- 1963 – Kennedy Polamalu, Samoan-American football player and coach
- 1963 – Brian Robbins, American actor, director, producer, and screenwriter
- 1964 – Apetor, Norwegian YouTuber (died 2021)
- 1964 – Benoit Benjamin, American basketball player
- 1964 – Stephen Geoffreys, American actor
- 1964 – Robbie Slater, English-Australian footballer and sportscaster
- 1965 – Valeriya Gansvind, Estonian chess player
- 1965 – Olga Kisseleva, Russian artist
- 1965 – Mads Mikkelsen, Danish actor
- 1966 – Mark Pritchard, English politician
- 1966 – Nicholas Rowe, British actor
- 1966 – Michael K. Williams, American actor (died 2021)
- 1967 – Boris Becker, German tennis player
- 1967 – Tom Elliott, Australian investment banker
- 1967 – Mark Ruffalo, American actor
- 1967 – Bart Veldkamp, Dutch-Belgian speed skater and coach
- 1968 – Daedra Charles, American basketball player and coach (died 2018)
- 1968 – Sidse Babett Knudsen, Danish actress
- 1969 – Byron Houston, American basketball player
- 1969 – Marjane Satrapi, Iranian author and illustrator (died 2026)
- 1970 – Marvan Atapattu, Sri Lankan cricketer
- 1970 – Chris Fryar, American drummer
- 1970 – Stel Pavlou, English author and screenwriter
- 1971 – Cath Bishop, English rower
- 1971 – Kyran Bracken, Irish-English rugby player
- 1972 – Olivier Brouzet, French rugby player
- 1972 – Russell Hoult, English footballer
- 1972 – Jay Payton, American baseball player
- 1973 – Sharin Foo, Danish musician and singer
- 1973 – Andrew Walker, Australian rugby player
- 1974 – Joe Nathan, American baseball player
- 1974 – David Pelletier, Canadian figure skater and coach
- 1976 – Adrian Bakalli, Belgian footballer
- 1976 – Torsten Frings, German footballer and coach
- 1976 – Regina Halmich, German boxer
- 1976 – Ville Valo, Finnish singer-songwriter
- 1977 – Kerem Gönlüm, Turkish basketball player
- 1978 – Colin Best, Australian rugby league player
- 1979 – Christian Terlizzi, Italian footballer
- 1980 – David Artell, English footballer and coach
- 1980 – Shawn Fanning, American computer programmer and businessman, founded Napster
- 1980 – Yaroslav Rybakov, Russian high jumper
- 1981 – Pape Sow, Senegalese basketball player
- 1982 – Xavier Doherty, Australian cricketer
- 1982 – Derrick Johnson, American football player
- 1982 – Yakubu, Nigerian footballer
- 1983 – Tyler Hilton, American actor and singer-songwriter
- 1983 – Peter Ramage, English footballer
- 1984 – Scarlett Johansson, American actress
- 1985 – Asamoah Gyan, Ghanaian footballer
- 1985 – Dieumerci Mbokani, Congolese footballer
- 1985 – Mandy Minella, Luxembourgian tennis player
- 1985 – Adam Ottavino, American baseball player
- 1985 – James Roby, English rugby league player
- 1986 – Oscar Pistorius, South African sprinter and convicted murderer
- 1987 – Martti Aljand, Estonian swimmer
- 1987 – Elias, American wrestler
- 1987 – Marouane Fellaini, Belgian footballer
- 1988 – Jamie Campbell Bower, English actor, singer, and model
- 1988 – Drew Pomeranz, American baseball player
- 1988 – Austin Romine, American baseball player
- 1989 – Alden Ehrenreich, American actor
- 1989 – Candice Glover, American singer
- 1989 – Chris Smalling, English footballer
- 1989 – Gabriel Torje, Romanian footballer
- 1990 – Brock Osweiler, American football player
- 1990 – Jang Dong-woo, South Korean singer and actor
- 1991 – Tarik Black, American basketball player
- 1991 – Gab Pangilinan, Filipino actress and singer
- 1992 – Natalie Achonwa, Canadian basketball player
- 1992 – Carles Gil, Spanish footballer
- 1992 – Vladislav Namestnikov, Russian ice hockey player
- 1994 – Samantha Bricio, Mexican volleyball player
- 1994 – Dacre Montgomery, Australian actor
- 1994 – Nicolás Stefanelli, Argentine footballer
- 1994 – Keiji Tanaka, Japanese figure skater
- 1995 – Katherine McNamara, American actress
- 1996 – Hailey Bieber, American model
- 1996 – Mackenzie Lintz, American actress
- 1996 – JuJu Smith-Schuster, American football player
- 1996 – Woozi, South Korean singer, songwriter, record producer, member of boy band Seventeen
- 1999 – Trey McBride, American football player
- 1999 – Dwight McNeil, English footballer
- 2000 – Auliʻi Cravalho, American actress and singer
- 2001 – Chenle, Chinese singer
- 2002 – Brandon Miller, American basketball player
- 2002 – Owen Power, Canadian ice hockey player

== Deaths ==
=== Pre-1600 ===
- 365 – Antipope Felix II
- 950 – Lothair II of Italy (born 926)
- 1249 – As-Salih Ayyub, ruler of Egypt
- 1286 – Eric V of Denmark (born 1249)
- 1318 – Mikhail of Tver (born 1271)
- 1538 – John Lambert, English Protestant martyr

=== 1601–1900 ===
- 1617 – Ahmed I, Sultan of the Ottoman Empire and Caliph of Islam (born 1590)
- 1694 – John Tillotson, English archbishop (born 1630)
- 1697 – Libéral Bruant, French architect and academic, designed Les Invalides (born c. 1635)
- 1718 – Blackbeard, English pirate (born 1680)
- 1758 – Richard Edgcumbe, 1st Baron Edgcumbe, English politician, Lord Lieutenant of Cornwall (born 1680)
- 1774 – Robert Clive, English general, politician and first British governor of Bengal (born 1725)
- 1813 – Johann Christian Reil, German physician, physiologist, and anatomist (born 1759)
- 1819 – John Stackhouse, English botanist (born 1742)
- 1871 – Oscar James Dunn, African American activist and politician, Lieutenant Governor of Louisiana 1868-1871 (born 1826)
- 1875 – Henry Wilson, American politician, 18th Vice President of the United States (born 1812)
- 1886 – Mary Boykin Chesnut, American author (born 1823)
- 1896 – George Washington Gale Ferris Jr., American engineer, invented the Ferris wheel (born 1859)
- 1900 – Arthur Sullivan, English composer (born 1842)

=== 1901–present ===
- 1902 – Walter Reed, American physician and entomologist (born 1851)
- 1913 – Tokugawa Yoshinobu, Japanese shōgun (born 1837)
- 1916 – Jack London, American novelist and journalist (born 1876)
- 1919 – Francisco Moreno, Argentinian explorer and academic (born 1852)
- 1921 – Edward J. Adams, American serial/spree killer and bank robber (born 1887)
- 1923 – Andy O'Sullivan, Irish Republican died in the 1923 Irish hunger strikes
- 1941 – Werner Mölders, German colonel and pilot (born 1913)
- 1943 – Lorenz Hart, American composer (born 1895)
- 1944 – Arthur Eddington, English astrophysicist and astronomer (born 1882)
- 1946 – Otto Georg Thierack, German jurist and politician, German Minister of Justice (born 1889)
- 1955 – Shemp Howard, American actor and comedian (born 1895)
- 1956 – Theodore Kosloff, Russian-American actor, ballet dancer, and choreographer (born 1882)
- 1963 – Aldous Huxley, English novelist and philosopher (born 1894)
- 1963 – John F. Kennedy, American politician, 35th President of the United States (born 1917)
- 1963 – C. S. Lewis, British writer, literary scholar, and Anglican lay theologian (born 1898)
- 1963 – J. D. Tippit, American police officer (born 1924)
- 1966 – Herbert Wilkinson Ayre, English footballer (born 1882)
- 1966 – Émile Drain, French actor (born 1890)
- 1980 – Jules Léger, Canadian journalist and politician, Governor General of Canada (born 1913)
- 1980 – Norah McGuinness, Irish painter and illustrator (born 1901)
- 1980 – Mae West, American stage and film actress (born 1893)
- 1981 – Hans Adolf Krebs, German-English physician and biochemist, Nobel Prize laureate (born 1900)
- 1986 – Scatman Crothers, American actor and comedian (born 1910)
- 1988 – Luis Barragán, Mexican architect and engineer (born 1902)
- 1989 – René Moawad, Lebanese lawyer and politician, 13th President of Lebanon (born 1925)
- 1991 – Tadashi Imai, Japanese director (born 1912)
- 1992 – Sterling Holloway, American actor (born 1905)
- 1993 – Anthony Burgess, English novelist, playwright, and critic (born 1917)
- 1993 – Tatiana Petrovna Nikolayeva, Soviet pianist, composer, and teacher (born 1924)
- 1996 – Terence Donovan, English photographer and director (born 1936)
- 1997 – Michael Hutchence, Australian singer-songwriter (born 1960)
- 1998 – Stu Ungar, American poker player (born 1953)
- 2000 – Christian Marquand, French actor, director, and screenwriter (born 1927)
- 2001 – Mary Kay Ash, American businesswoman, founded Mary Kay, Inc. (born 1918)
- 2001 – Theo Barker, English historian and academic (born 1923)
- 2001 – Norman Granz, American record producer, founded Verve Records (born 1918)
- 2002 – Parley Baer, American actor (born 1914)
- 2002 – Rafał Gan-Ganowicz, Polish mercenary and journalist (born 1932)
- 2005 – Bruce Hobbs, American jockey and trainer (born 1920)
- 2006 – Asima Chatterjee, Indian chemist (born 1917)
- 2006 – Pat Dobson, American baseball player and coach (born 1942)
- 2007 – Maurice Béjart, French-Swiss dancer, choreographer, and director (born 1927)
- 2007 – Verity Lambert, English television producer (born 1935)
- 2010 – Jean Cione, American baseball player (born 1928)
- 2010 – Frank Fenner, Australian virologist and microbiologist (born 1914)
- 2011 – Svetlana Alliluyeva, Russian-American author (born 1926)
- 2011 – Sena Jurinac, Bosnian-Austrian soprano (born 1921)
- 2011 – Lynn Margulis, American biologist and academic (born 1938)
- 2011 – Paul Motian, American drummer and composer (born 1931)
- 2012 – Bryce Courtenay, South African-Australian author (born 1933)
- 2013 – Tom Gilmartin, Irish businessman (born 1935)
- 2013 – Georges Lautner, French director and screenwriter (born 1926)
- 2013 – Alec Reid, Irish priest and activist (born 1931)
- 2015 – Salahuddin Quader Chowdhury, Bangladeshi politician (born 1949)
- 2015 – Ali Ahsan Mohammad Mojaheed, Bangladeshi politician (born 1948)
- 2015 – Kim Young-sam, South Korean soldier and politician, President of South Korea (born 1927)
- 2016 – M. Balamuralikrishna, Indian vocalist and singer (born 1930)
- 2017 – George Avakian, American music producer (born 1919)
- 2017 – Dmitri Hvorostovsky, Russian operatic baritone (born 1962)
- 2017 – Tommy Keene, American singer-songwriter (born 1958)
- 2020 – Otto Hutter, Austrian-born British physiologist (born 1924)
- 2022 – John Y. Brown Jr., American soldier, lawyer, and politician, 55th Governor of Kentucky (born 1933)
- 2022 – Raşit Küçük, Turkish Islamicist (born 1947)
- 2024 – Serge Vohor, Vanuatuan politician, 4th Prime Minister of Vanuatu (born 1955)

== Holidays and observances ==
- Christian feast day:
  - Cecilia
  - Pedro Esqueda Ramírez
  - Philemon and Apphia
  - Pragmatius of Autun
  - Blessed Salvatore Lilli
  - Blessed Tommaso Reggio
  - November 22 (Eastern Orthodox liturgics)
- Good Spouses Day (いい夫婦の日) celebrates married couples in Japan.
- Independence Day celebrates the independence of Lebanon from France in 1943.

== Notes ==
- Wilson, Scott (2016). Resting Places: The Burial Sites of More Than 14,000 Famous Persons (3rd ed.). McFarland. ISBN 978-0-7864-7992-4.
