= The Philadelphia Eleven =

- Release date: September 2023
- Running time: 86 minutes
- Country: United States
- Language: English

The Philadelphia Eleven is a 2023 American documentary about the first women ordained as priests in the Episcopal Church. The long-form documentary was developed by Time Travel Productions to coincide with the 50th anniversary of the ordination of the eleven women who presented themselves for ordination at the Church of the Advocate in Philadelphia, Pennsylvania on July 29, 1974.

== Synopsis ==
The ordination of the Philadelphia Eleven was an act of civil disobedience as they were ordained despite the Episcopal Church's prohibition at that time against the female priests. In 1974, there was actually no canon that specifically forbade women from becoming priests, but the Episcopal Church's diocesan standing committees and bishops almost always rejected women's requests for ordination. Prior to their ordination, there had been two failed legislative votes at General Convention to allow the ordination of women. Of the Philadelphia Eleven, only one had received the backing of her standing committee and their bishops refused to ordain them. Three retired bishops agreed to ordain the eleven women despite the fact that it could be seen as a violation of canonical law and church tradition.

Finding a venue for the ordination was challenging, but the Church of the Advocate, a Black church in Northern Philadelphia invited the group to hold the ordination in their sanctuary. The women were harassed and threatened. Nonetheless, more than 2000 people attended the ordination service of the Philadelphia Eleven and there was a lot of press from all major television networks and print media outlets. The ordination was so controversial that there were threats of violence. The Black Panthers and a group of lesbian bodyguards provided security. To begin the service, the eleven women entered the church through the back door as a security precaution, whereas the traditional approach was to process from the front entrance of the church through the pews.

After their ordination, the new priests continued to receive backlash and even violent threats, and some were ostracized by some friends, family and parishes. The retired bishops, who had ordained them, were censured by the House of Bishops. Several priests, who had invited the new female priests to celebrate Eucharist at their parishes, were charged and convicted of violating church canon.

Nonetheless, the women had allies and more women were also ordained in other parts of the country. This wave of new female priests challenged the patriarchy within Christendom, sought a "new way" of providing leadership in the church, and created a blueprint for lasting institutional change.

For several years after the ordinations, church leaders debated the validity of the women's ordinations. In September 1976, at General Convention, a new section of the church's ordination canons was approved stating its provisions "shall be equally applicable to men and women." At that time, the ordinations of women in 1974-1975 were approved.

== Production ==
The Philadelphia Eleven is an unrated American film. It has a running time of 86 minutes.

Margo Guernsey is the director and producer of the film. Nikki Bramley is the co-producer and the director of photography. The executive producer is Katie Eccles, the editor is Rabab Haj Yahya and the composer is Saul Simon MacWilliams.

== Release ==
The feature-length documentary premiered in September 2023 at the Church of the Advocate.

The Philadelphia Eleven was screened at the Athena Film Festival, Sidewalk Film Festival and the Sedona International Film Festival. It was also screened at special events around the country to commemorate the 50th anniversary of the ordination of the Philadelphia Eleven. This included a special screening at the Washington National Cathedral.

The film received favorable reviews and numerous honors. It was named "Best Documentary" by The Boston Globe's Globe Docs. At the Centre Film Festival, it received the "Juror's Choice Award." At the Dunedin International Film Festival, it won a "Best Documentary Honorable Mention."
