= Walter Edmonds =

Walter Edmonds may refer to:

- Walter D. Edmonds (1903–1998), American writer
- Walter Edmonds (artist) (1938–2011), American artist
