= Paul Washington =

Priest and activist (1921–2002)

- Born: Paul Washington; May 26, 1921; Charleston, South Carolina, U.S.
- Died: October 7, 2002 (aged 81); U.S.
- Occupations: Priest, Activist

Paul Washington (May 26, 1921 – October 7, 2002) was an Episcopal priest and community activist in Philadelphia.

== Early life and education ==
Washington was born in Charleston, South Carolina, the United States on May 26, 1921. He attended the Avery Institute and subsequently Lincoln University. Washington graduated from Philadelphia Divinity School. He did his pastoral work at the Church of the Crucifixion at 8th and Bainbridge Streets in South Philadelphia, where he met his future wife, Christine.

== Career ==
Immediately after marriage in 1947, Washington and his wife went to Liberia as missionaries. There, Washington served as business manager of Cuttington College during its post-war revival and rebuilding, Cuttington went on to educate many African leaders. For a time Washington was its acting president. The couple returned from Liberia to Philadelphia in 1954 because their son Paul Marc was suffering from repeated malaria attacks. At this time, he was appointed Vicar of St. Cyprian's Episcopal Church in the Elmwood (now Eastwick) section of Philadelphia.

In 1962, Washington was made rector of the George W. South Memorial Church of the Advocate in Philadelphia, a position he held for 25 years until his retirement in 1987.

During his years at the Advocate, Washington served as Episcopal Chaplain at Eastern State Penitentiary. He served on the MOVE Commission established by then-Mayor Wilson Goode to investigate the May 13, 1985 aerial bombing by Philadelphia police of a rowhouse fortified by MOVE members and the ensuing conflagration that killed 11 people and destroyed 61 homes. The Commission found the bombing "unconscionable" and suggested methods the city of Philadelphia might use to prevent similar future situations. Washington also served as the chaplain of the Advocate Communities Development Corporation's (ACDC) Board of Directors. He continued to serve ACDC until the fall of 1998. ACDC was established by his wife, Christine, and constructed multimillion-dollar projects, rehab and new construction for those in need. Over 400 units of housing have been added to the North Philadelphia community.

In 1994, the Temple University Press published "Other Sheep I Have": the Autobiography of Father Paul M. Washington, written with David McI. Gracie.

Washington died October 7, 2002. He was known and revered in particular for his advocacy of the oppressed and disadvantaged. He was called the "conscience of the city".

=== Social and religious advocate ===
During his 25 years at the Advocate, he was recognized as one of the key leaders of the Black Power movement. When there was nowhere else for gatherings to be held, Washington would allow them to meet at the Advocate. He hosted the third National Conference on Black Power in 1968, attended by thousands of delegates from across the U.S. Two years later he hosted the Convention of the Black Panther Party. Huey Newton was one of the speakers. In 1971, the Church of the Advocate was the site for the rally to raise money for the Angela Davis Defense Fund.

The 1970s also marked Washington's increasing involvement in another area of inequality, the role of women in the Episcopal Church. At the Church of the Advocate on July 29, 1974, Washington participated in the irregular ceremony in which the first eleven women were ordained into the priesthood in this denomination, as the Philadelphia Eleven. The ordination sermon was, however, delivered by a layman, Charles V. Willie who, at the time, was Vice President of the House of Deputies of the Episcopal Church. The ordination proved highly controversial as many members of the Episcopal Church were reluctant to acknowledge the priesthood of women. Washington was formally admonished by the bishop of Pennsylvania, Lyman Ogilvy, for allowing the Church of the Advocate to be used as the venue for the ordination, and the validity of the ordination itself was disputed. Meeting in emergency session in Chicago, the House of Bishops of the Episcopal Church invalidated the ordination by a vote of 128 to 9 because the four officiating bishops had "not fulfilled constitutional and canonical requirements". This event marked a new era for both the Episcopal Church and the Church of the Advocate. Ultimately, in 1977, the Episcopal church did make rules changes to accept women priests.

In 1989, Washington delivered the principal address at the consecration in Boston, Massachusetts, of the Reverend Barbara C. Harris, a protege of Washington's, as the first female Episcopal bishop.

During the Iran hostage crisis, at the request of former U.S. Attorney General Ramsey Clark, Washington was one of ten Americans who participated in a June 1980 international peace conference entitled "Crimes of America" in Iran. The group's trip was in conscious defiance of a ban on travel to Iran and exposed each delegate to fines of up to $50,000 and imprisonment for up to 10 years. There were calls across the country for investigation and prosecution of the delegates.

== Honors ==
Honorary Doctorate, Temple University, May 1988.

In 1985, Washington received the Philadelphia Bowl from Mayor Wilson Goode before 1,200 assembled at a tribute banquet at The Bellevue-Stratford Hotel

In 1986, Washington received the Philadelphia Award, an annual award for community service bearing a $25,000 cash prize.

== See also ==
The Father Paul M. Washington Papers are held by the Charles L. Blockson Afro-American Collection, Temple University Libraries.

== Sources ==
- Father Paul Washington Papers at Temple University Libraries
- Drama Review, 12 (Summer 1968), pp. 29–39.
