= Philadelphia Eleven =

First women priests in the Episcopal Church

The Philadelphia Eleven are the eleven women who were the first women ordained priests in the Episcopal Church on July 29, 1974, two years before General Convention affirmed and explicitly authorized the ordination of women to the priesthood.

== Background ==
In the Episcopal Church, a member church of the worldwide Anglican Communion, women being ordained priests in 1974 culminated a many decades long effort of women who had sought to increase their participation in and service to the Episcopal Church, first as laywomen and later as ordained women. Anglicans had long debated the issue. The 1974 priestly ordinations resulted from prolonged efforts by many people, as well as changes in the Episcopal church and American society. No canon (church) law prohibited the ordination of women as deacons, priests or bishops; it had long been discussed and debated within the Anglican Communion. But only men were ordained priests or consecrated as bishops. Men were routinely ordained as "transitional deacons" before becoming priests a year later; now, permanent deacons are recognized as an order within clergy. Actually, the first woman ordained a priest was Rev. Florence Li Tim-Oi who had been ordained in 1944 Hong Kong behind Japanese lines during World War II. Hong Kong ordained two other women priests in 1971, Joyce M. Bennett and Jane Hwang Hsien Yuen; Canada legally ordained its first women priests in December 1976.

During the first half of the twentieth century, women in the Episcopal Church continued to explore ways to increase their participation in the life of the church. Women had long sought ways to participate and serve in the Episcopal Church, to "answer their calls," sometimes finding them thwarted as Frederick W. Schmidt discusses in "The Episcopal Church: A Hierarchical and Male-Dominated Culture." In 1871, lay women founded the Woman's Auxiliary to the Board of Missions of the Protestant Episcopal Church which raised millions of dollars for its work The Woman's Auxiliary (now, Episcopal Churchwomen) which has provided massive amounts of funding and missionary support for the church through its United Thank Offering. Lay women served on parish altar guilds, taught Sunday school, and belonged to various parish guilds and circles which prayed, studied and acted. In 1850 members of the Dorcas Society sewed clothing for the poor; in 1970 San Jose Costa Rica they packaged seeds for distribution. As Irene Brown explains, their "traditional" female work of feeding, sewing as well as holding church bazaars can be understood as religious devotion. Episcopal women worked in their parishes as professional church workers; and became directors of religious education, or "DREs." Women also joined a variety of church-related groups including the Girls' Friendly Society, the King's Daughters, Mothers' Meetings and Young Married Women's Society. As part of the Social Gospel movement women became more publicly active in church-related organizations. Historian Mary Sudman Donovan notes that "a surprisingly large number of women writers and educators" became Episcopalians, including both Catherine Beecher and her sister Harriet Beecher Stowe, Emma Willard and Sarah Josepha Hale (editor of Godey's Lady's Book). Women were gradually allowed to be elected to serve on church vestries (parish governing structures). In 1916, the Bishop of Maine, the Rt. Rev. Benjamin Brewster had first proposed "to accord to female communicants of the Church full rights, responsibilities, and privileges." But the House of Bishops resolved, "That it is inexpedient to adopt a Constitutional amendment providing for the election of women as members of the House of Deputies." In 1946, Elizabeth Dyer (Mrs. Randolph H. Dyer) was elected from the Diocese of Missouri and became the first woman seated at a General Convention. In 1970 women officially became deputies to the church wide General Convention.

Two other roles for Episcopal women to serve were as nuns in sisterhoods and as deaconesses reflect its Catholic-Protestant duality. The first Episcopal sisterhoods followed English women's examples and met some suspicion for being too similar to Roman Catholic ones. Their famous nursing during the 1878 yellow fever epidemic that killed 5000 people in Memphis changed attitudes towards Episcopal women becoming sisters. The order of deaconesses was revived in Kaiserwerth Germany.

The New York Training School for Deaconesses and St. Margaret's House of Berkeley, California trained deaconesses. Windham House in New York City trained women for other professional roles. They lived and worked in settlement houses such Hull-House in Chicago which Ellen Starr Gates co-founded with Jane Addams.

Although a few women had long declared they felt called to be priests as Jeannette Piccard told President M. Carey Thomas, president off Bryn Mawr College when she entered college. The Episcopal Church had little urgency. In 1958 women were allowed to enter the Episcopal Theological Seminary in Cambridge, Massachusetts, followed in 1960 by the Virginia Theological Seminary in Alexandria, Virginia, which opened the M.Div. professional credential; women first joined courses in 1958 and were admitted into degree programs beginning in 1960; Phyllis Ingraham graduated with a VTS degree in 1966. The movement for ordination gained explicit momentum in 1970 when laywomen were seated with voice and vote for the first time in General Convention, the bicameral legislative body of the Episcopal Church. They called for a vote to eliminate the canon law on "deaconesses" so that male and female deacons would be treated equally.

In 1965, James Pike, Bishop of California, had recognized Phyllis Edwards as a deacon in his diocese. Edwards, a 56 year old widow with four children had been ordained a year earlier under the old canon law using the term "deaconess." In 1975 she wanted to be ordained at the second "irregular" ordination, in Washington DC but her bishop made that impossible; she was ordained in 1990.

This increased awareness led to the General Convention of 1970 eliminating canonical distinctions between male deacons and female deaconesses. Now, women who had previously been made deaconess and were seeking ordination to the priesthood would be recognized as full and equal deacons. The Episcopal Church then faced whether to ordain women as priests—and bishops too.

A resolution was put forward by the women deputies at the 1970 General Convention to approve women's ordination to the priesthood and episcopate. It failed to pass the House of Deputies but nonetheless had much positive support. The voting procedure used considered "divided votes"—when the deputies of a diocese split evenly—as negative votes so that a resolution could have a majority but still fail. The Anglican Consultative Council met for the first time in 1971 and considered the issue of women's ordination to the priesthood on a communion-wide level, resolving that women should be allowed to be ordained priests under certain local conditions. The church wide publication, The Episcopalian, featured two articles in its February 1972 issue "Ordain Women, Yes, No?," and "Young Clergymen Today" implicitly showing the church's situation. In preparation for the next General Convention to be held in Houston TX in 1973, a group of female professional church workers, deaconesses, female seminarians, and their supporters met in 1971 to form the Episcopal Women's Caucus, a national organization to plan future advocacy work for women's ordination. However, when similar legislation failed to pass at the 1973 General Convention because of a parliamentary technicality, some of the women began to plan new strategies, feeling that they could not wait another three years for women's priesthood to be legislatively approved. Suzanne Hiatt, a deacon, stated a shared sentiment among these women that their "vocation was not to continue to ask for permission to be a priest, but to be a priest."

In November 1973, several women who were deacons met with bishops who supported their cause, only to find them unwilling to ordain women to the priesthood until General Convention had settled the issue. On December 15, 1973, when five women previously ordained as deacons presented themselves at a priestly ordination service in New York, Paul Moore, Jr., Bishop of New York, allowed them to participate but declined to lay hands on their heads to ordain them priests. The women and a large part of the congregation walked out of the service in protest.

By June 1974, as supporters of women's ordination to the priesthood grew restless, three retired bishops stepped forward and agreed to ordain a group of qualified women deacons. The bishops were: Daniel Corrigan, retired bishop suffragan of Colorado; Robert L. DeWitt, recently resigned Bishop of Pennsylvania; and Edward R. Welles II, retired Bishop of West Missouri,

Eleven women who were deacons in good standing presented themselves as ready for ordination to the priesthood, and plans for the service proceeded. The women who became known as the "Philadelphia Eleven" (or "Philadelphia 11") were Merrill Bittner, Alla Bozarth-Campbell, Alison Cheek, Emily Hewitt, Carter Heyward, Suzanne Hiatt, Marie Moorefield, Jeannette Piccard, Betty Bone Schiess, Katrina Swanson, and Nancy Wittig.

== Ordination service July 1974 ==
Ordination service at the Church of the Advocate

The ordination service was held on Monday, July 29, 1974, the Feast of Saints Mary and Martha, at the predominately Black Church of the Advocate in Philadelphia, where Suzanne Hiatt served as deacon, and whose rector was civil rights advocate Paul Washington. Four years earlier the Church of the Advocate had hosted a Black Panther Convention. Beginning at 11 o'clock in the morning, with the appropriate hymn "Come Labor On," the service lasted for three hours. The eleven women deacons presented themselves to Bishops Corrigan, DeWitt, and Welles, who ordained them as priests.

Harvard University Sociology professor Charles V. Willie, who was also the vice president of the House of Deputies at the time, preached a sermon entitled, "The Priesthood of All Believers," which began, "The hour cometh and now is when the true worshipers shall worship God in spirit and in truth," followed by Dr. Willie's declaration that "as blacks refused to participate in their own oppression by going to the back of the bus in 1955 in Montgomery, women are refusing to cooperate in their own oppression by remaining on the periphery of full participation in the Church." The crowd numbered almost two thousand supporters and a few protesters. In the middle of the service when Corrigan said, "If there be any of you who knoweth any impediment or notable crime (in these women), let him come forth in the name of God..." several priests in attendance proceeded to read statements against the ordination. Once these statements had been made, the bishops responded that they were acting in obedience to God, noting that "hearing God's command, we can heed no other. The time for our obedience is now." And they proceeded with the ordinations.

José Antonio Ramos, Bishop of Costa Rica, was also present at the service but did not participate in the act of ordination due to his young and active episcopate. Barbara C. Harris, who was senior warden at Church of the Advocate and would later become the first woman ordained bishop in the Episcopal Church on February 11, 1989, led the procession into the service as its crucifer. Patricia Merchant Park, one of the leaders of the Episcopal Women's Caucus was later the second woman to be regularly ordained as a priest on January 2, 1977, after General Convention had given its endorsement, served as deacon. An iconic photo of the service was published on July 30 in The Philadelphia Inquirer and published worldwide.

== Aftermath ==
Two weeks after the ordination service had taken place, on August 14–15, Presiding Bishop John Allin, the elected head of the Episcopal Church, convened an emergency meeting of the House of Bishops at O'Hare International Airport in Chicago. At first, the House declared the priestly ordinations of the eleven women to be "invalid," stating that "we express our conviction that the necessary conditions for ordination to the priesthood in the Episcopal Church were not fulfilled on the occasion in question, since we are convinced that a bishop's authority to ordain can be effectively exercised only in and for a community which has authorized him to act for them..." Then Arthur A. Vogel, Bishop of West Missouri, raised his objection. Considered the most theologically astute of the bishops, Vogel told his colleagues that they had no theological grounds for declaring the ordinations invalid because they were performed by bishops in good standing according to the Ordination Rite in the Book of Common Prayer and by laying-on-of-hands within the Apostolic Succession. To declare the ordinations invalid would be to flout hundreds of years of orthodox definition for the criteria of valid ordination. The House of Bishops listened and changed its position, declaring the women irregularly ordained instead. The irregularity involved was one of protocol. The women had completed the normal pre-ordination process of theological education, examinations and meetings with their bishops and diocesan representatives, and most had gained the necessary signed lay and clergy testimonials vouching for their character and preparation, but their local standing committees were timid about aftermath and refused to give their endorsement. This was the detail in every case and the one breach of canon law requirement that could qualify their be regarded as "irregularly" ordained priests. Through no fault or lack of effort of their own, they were unable to fulfill a canonically required point of protocol. Despite their anger, the bishops listened to Vogel, a highly respected theologian, and they conceded the point. The bishops also admonished Episcopalians not to recognize any of the eleven women as priests until the next General Convention in 1976 could decide on their ecclesiastical status.

When the House of Bishops met again at its regularly scheduled meeting in October in Oaxtepec, Mexico, however, the body endorsed "in principle" the ordination of women to the priesthood, which it had assented to as well at its meeting in New Orleans in 1972. This was in no way an overturning of its decision that the priestly ordinations of the Eleven had been irregular, and the body further urged its bishops to refrain from ordaining more women to the priesthood "unless and until such activities have been approved by the General Convention" meeting in 1976.

Meanwhile, three of the first women to become priests took opportunities to celebrate the Eucharist against orders from their bishops. Alison Cheek, Jeannette Piccard and Carter Heyward celebrated communion together at an ecumenical service at Riverside Church in New York City on Reformation Sunday, October 27, 1974. A couple of weeks later on Sunday, November 10, 1974, Alison Cheek celebrated the Eucharist at St. Stephen and the Incarnation Episcopal Church in Washington, D.C. This first public celebration of the Eucharist in the Episcopal Church by a priest who was a woman was permitted by the church's rector, William Wendt. The following month, Alison Cheek and Carter Heyward were invited to celebrate the Eucharist on Sunday, December 8, at Christ Episcopal Church in Oberlin, Ohio, by its rector, Peter Beebe. These events didn't go unnoticed by the larger church, and in the summer of 1975 both Wendt and Beebe were brought to ecclesiastical trial by their dioceses and convicted of disobeying a "godly admonition" from their bishops against permitting the women to celebrate the Eucharist.

Not all Episcopal Church institutions opposed the priestly ordinations or the women. In January 1975 the trustees of the Episcopal Divinity School in Cambridge, Massachusetts, offered faculty appointments with full priestly duties to Suzanne Hiatt and Carter Heyward. Both women began celebrating the Eucharist in the seminary chapel in March 1975.

In February 1975, advocates of women's ordination to the priesthood and episcopate formed an organization called Women's Ordination Now (WON) to support the Philadelphia Eleven (and later the Washington Four) women as well as the bishops who had ordained them and William Wendt and Peter Beebe. At the 1976 General Convention, WON worked to see that the irregularly ordained women were fully recognized as priests and allowed to function as priests without any penalties. A parallel and more moderate group, the National Coalition for the Ordination of Women, worked quietly behind the scenes and may have done more to achieve the new canon.

On June 28, 2024, the 81st General Convention of the Episcopal Church, in honor of the 50th anniversary of the Philadelphia 11, approved July 29 as the date to commemorate the Philadelphia 11.

=== Washington Four: September 1975 ===
As supporters of women's ordination to the priesthood continued to organize and plan for the 1976 General Convention amid all of this turmoil, the Church was surprised by a second ordination service, this time held in Washington, D.C. On Sunday, September 7, 1975, at St. Stephen and the Incarnation Episcopal Church, George W. Barrett, retired Bishop of Rochester, NY, ordained four more women who were deacons to the priesthood. The four women were Lee McGee (Street), Alison Palmer, Betty Rosenberg (Powell), and Diane Tickell. They became known as the "Washington Four" (or "Washington 4"). A fifth woman, Phyllis Edwards, had originally planned on taking part in the ordination but withdrew the week before. Edwards had been recognized as a deacon by James Pike in 1965, potentially changing the status of the many women who for some decades had been ordained or instituted in a revived order of "deaconesses," but who had not consistently been regarded as members of the clergy. Over 1,000 people attended the service including the rector William Wendt, Peter Beebe, several of the Philadelphia Eleven priests, and again retired Pennsylvania bishop Robert L. DeWitt. McGee's husband, Kyle McGee, an Episcopal priest and chaplain at Georgetown University, preached at the service, stating that "today we are engaged in a prophetic act. I pray that our actions will help enable us who are present and the church universal to reexamine our beliefs and practices of priesthood so that we may include all Christians in the ministry of our Lord."

Presiding Bishop John Allin again spoke out against this second set of ordinations, declaring that Barrett had defied canon law (without citing what that law might be or where it was prohibited); William Creighton, Bishop of Washington; and "the rights of the entire membership of the Episcopal Church." While noting that such "destructive and divisive acts may be beyond prevention amid this age of confusion and turmoil," he added that "the tragedy is that so much done in good conscience for the sake of renewal can so frequently prevent that needed renewal." While none of the bishops who had participated in the irregular ordinations were called to ecclesiastical trial, they were censured by the House of Bishops and their actions decried.

=== Women's ordination to the priesthood and episcopate approved ===
The 1976 General Convention met in Minneapolis on September 15–23, 1976. On September 15, the House of Bishops voted 95 to 61 to change or eliminate ambiguous places in canon law that seemed to prevent the ordination of women to the priesthood, and to clarify matters by creating a canon to affirm the ordination of women as priests and bishops. Because of the two-house structure of the General Convention, the House of Deputies had to vote on the matter the following day. After much deliberation in that House, the clerical order voted 60 in favor, 39 opposed, and 15 divided, while the laity voted 64 in favor, 36 opposed, and 13 divided. Women's ordination to the priesthood and episcopacy was approved. That vote meant that women who were deacons could be canonically ordained to the priesthood as early as January 1, 1977, by authorization of a specifically affirming canon for that purpose. Later in the week, on September 21, the House of Bishops voted to require a "conditional ordination" for the fifteen women who had been irregularly ordained, much to the disappointment of the women and their supporters. The next day, however, the bishops reversed their decision and instead, in keeping with the status of "irregular" which they had imposed on the women, they voted to allow the individual diocesan bishops of the Philadelphia Eleven and Washington Four priests to "regularize" them in a form of their own discretion, with the option of a "public event" that would allow the people of their dioceses to welcome and celebrate the priestly ministries of the women. These services were held for the priests beginning in January 1977. (The official term for the service was "completion," offered as an alternative to conditional ordination.)

The first woman (already a deacon) canonically ordained to the priesthood on January 1, 1977, was Jacqueline A. Means, ordained by Donald J. Davis, Bishop of Erie, in the Episcopal Church of All Saints in Indianapolis. By the end of January 1977 about forty women had been ordained priests and an additional sixty by the end of the year. By 1979 almost 300 women had been ordained to the priesthood, and the total increased to more than 600 by 1985.

== Women involved ==
The eleven women (who were already deacons) who were ordained to the Episcopal priesthood at the Church of the Advocate in Philadelphia on July 29, 1974, and are known as the Philadelphia Eleven are:

1. Merrill Bittner was born in 1946 in Pasadena, California. A graduate of Lake Erie College and Bexley Hall Seminary, she was ordained as a deacon on January 6, 1973, in the Diocese of Rochester, where she served at the Episcopal Church of the Good Shepherd in Webster, New York. She was 27 when she was ordained to the priesthood in 1974. Like many of the other Philadelphia Eleven women, it was hard for her to find support and employment as a priest in the Episcopal Church following her ordination. Instead she worked in prison ministry and found herself roaming the country in a van working odd jobs before later becoming a career counselor. In 2001 she reentered parish ministry and has served as a priest at St. Barnabas Episcopal Church in Rumford, Maine.

2. Alla Renée Bozarth (Bozarth-Campbell) was born in Portland, Oregon on May 15, 1947. She earned her B.S.S. (1971) degree at Northwestern University in Interpretation, after which she was ordained deacon and served as staff minister at the Northwestern University congregation of St. Thomas à Becket from 1971 to 1973. She earned her M.A. (1972) and Ph.D. (1974) degrees at Northwestern University in Interpretation: Hermeneutics, Aesthetics and Performing Arts (School of Speech and Drama).

Bozarth was the first woman to be ordained as a deacon in the Diocese of Oregon on September 8, 1971. Her husband, Philip Ross Campbell (Bozarth-Campbell), was ordained as a deacon in 1973 and as a priest in 1974. In 1975 Bozarth incorporated Wisdom House, an ecumenical spirituality center, as a 501(c)3 non-profit religious corporation of the State of Minnesota (later the State of Oregon). She served at Wisdom House as priest-in-charge. After her husband's death in 1985, she returned to Sandy, Oregon and moved Wisdom House to her home there. She discontinued travel and public speaking in 1994 but was able to attend the 25th anniversary celebrations in Philadelphia in 1999. In 2004 Bozarth retired from her counseling practice and regular celebrations of the Holy Eucharist at Wisdom House. She continues to write and offer prayers and poems on blogs, celebrate the Eucharist for special occasions and provide pastoral care when asked, mostly by telephone or mail.

Bozarth is a poet and author. In 1978 she published her memoir Womanpriest: A Personal Odyssey. She has also two books on grief, Life is Goodbye/Life is Hello~ Grieving Well through All Kinds of Loss (1982) and A Journey through Grief (1990) and various meditation and poetry books. Her poem "Transfiguration" was presented to the Mayor of Hiroshima in May 1980, becoming part of the permanent collection of the Peace Memorial Garden. Bozarth's 10th anniversary poem for the Philadelphia Ordinations, "Passover Remembered," has become an ecumenical touchstone and is broadly used by women and men in leadership in Roman Catholic religious communities and others in various traditions. Bozarth has lectured for the Institute of Women Today in Chicago and several other cities, including Mankato, Minnesota, where she also gave a keynote address with Jean Audrey Powers at the first annual Women and Spirituality Conference in 1981.

3. Alison Mary Cheek was born in 1927 in Adelaide, South Australia, where she graduated from the University of Adelaide in 1947 and married her economics tutor, Bruce Cheek. The couple moved to Boston for his fellowship at Harvard University and then back to Australia two years later. They returned to the United States in 1957 when Bruce was hired by the World Bank in Washington, D.C. Cheek had become active as a lay leader at St. Alban's Episcopal Church in Annandale, Virginia, when her rector encouraged her to take some classes at Virginia Theological Seminary because she was increasingly being asked to lead programs at the church. She was admitted into the seminary's B.D. program in 1963 with no intention of seeking ordination, but suddenly felt a call to become a priest while on a retreat. With four young children at home, her bishop (around that time Robert F. Gibson, Jr. was diocesan Bishop of Virginia and Samuel B. Chilton was the suffragan bishop) dissuaded her from considering ordination, and it took her six years to complete her degree part-time. Following graduation from the seminary, she was hired as a lay minister at Christ Church in Alexandria, where she was in charge of pastoral ministry and allowed to preach a few times She then began training and working with the Pastoral Counseling and Consulting Centers of Greater Washington and the Washington Institute for Pastoral Psychotherapy, returning to St. Alban's to continue pastoral ministry as a laywoman Eventually, however, her rector encouraged her to enter the ordination process in the Diocese of Virginia, and she was ordained as the first woman ordained deacon in the South on January 29, 1972. When the House of Deputies voted against women's ordination in 1973, Cheek was motivated to work with other women and supporters to change the church's mind. After the Philadelphia Ordinations, Cheek accepted a number of invitations to celebrate the Eucharist although her priestly ordination had not been approved by the wider church. She also became active in marginalized groups such as the gay movement, black movement, and women in poverty, sticking to the margins of the church to exercise her ministry. In 1976 Time magazine named her as one of twelve women of the year for her advocacy and action on behalf of women's ordination. She was hired as an assistant priest at St. Stephen and the Incarnation Episcopal Church in Washington, D.C., and later Trinity Memorial Church in Philadelphia before going back to school at the Episcopal Divinity School, where she was hired as the Director of Feminist Liberation Studies in 1989 and earned her D.Min. degree in 1990. In 1996 she joined the Greenfire Community and Retreat Center in Tenants Harbor, Maine, where she served as a facilitator, teacher, and counselor, and later became active with St. Peter's Episcopal Church in Rockland.

4. Emily Clark Hewitt was born in Baltimore, Maryland in 1944. After earning a degree from Cornell University in 1966, she served as an administrator of the Cornell/Hofstra Upward Bound Program at the Union Settlement House in East Harlem from 1967 to 1969. Called to ordained ministry in the Episcopal Church, Hewitt was ordained as a deacon on June 3, 1972, in the Diocese of New York, and was supported by St. Mary's Episcopal Church in Manhattanville, New York. Hewitt co-authored the book Women Priests: Yes or No? with fellow Philadelphia Eleven priest Suzanne Hiatt in 1973. While serving as assistant professor of religion and education at Andover Newton Theological School in Newton Centre, Massachusetts, from 1973 to 1975, she was ordained to the priesthood in Philadelphia at the age of 30 in 1974, and received her M.Phil. degree from Union Theological Seminary the following year. Finding it hard to practice her priesthood in the Episcopal Church, Hewitt continued her education, earning a J.D. from Harvard University in 1978. That same year she began practicing law at the Boston law firm of Hill & Barlow, where she was elected a partner in 1985 and served as chair of the real estate department from 1987 to 1993. In 1993 she became the General Counsel of the United States General Services Administration, where she served until being commissioned as a judge of the United States Court of Federal Claims by President Clinton in 1998. Hewitt married former U.S. Assistant Attorney General Eleanor D. Acheson in 2004. In 2009, President Obama designated Hewitt to serve as Chief Judge of the U.S. Court of Federal Claims.

5. Isabel Carter Heyward was born in Charlotte, North Carolina, in 1945. She earned a B.A. from Randolph-Macon Woman's College in Lynchburg, Virginia, in 1967 and then moved to New York to begin a B.D. at Union Theological Seminary. Finding that she wasn't sure where she stood regarding her involvement in the church, she left Union after a year and moved back home to Charlotte to work at her home parish, St. Martin's Episcopal Church, as a lay assistant, doing all the duties except those reserved for priests. In 1971 she returned to New York and pursued an M.A. in the comparative study of religion at Columbia University before completing an M.Div. back at Union in 1973. She later went on to earn a Ph.D. in systematic theology from Union in 1980. Feeling a call to the priesthood, Heyward was ordained a deacon on June 9, 1973, in the Diocese of New York and ordained to the priesthood in Philadelphia at 29 in 1974. Following this ordination, Heyward and fellow priest Suzanne Hiatt were hired as assistant professors at the Episcopal Divinity School (EDS) in January 1975, where she received tenure in 1981. Heyward's teaching at EDS focused on 19th century Anglican theology, feminist liberation theology, and the theology of sexuality. She has published numerous books on these topics during her tenure, including A Priest Forever, an autobiographical account of her ordination published in 1976. Heyward retired from teaching in 2005 and moved back to North Carolina.

6. Suzanne Radley Hiatt was born in Hartford, Connecticut, in 1936. As a child she dreamed of entering the ordained ministry of the church, but dismissed the thought as impossible before feeling a call to ordination again in her twenties. She attended high school in Edina, Minnesota, and then one year of college at Wellesley College before transferring to Radcliffe College, where she earned a bachelor's degree in American history in 1958. After graduation she worked for two years as a Girl Scout professional in Hartford, traveled around Europe, and taught high school. Feeling her call to ordination return, she entered the Episcopal Theological School (ETS), where she received her M.Div. in 1964. She completed an M.S.W. from Boston University the following year and moved back to Minnesota where she worked with the Presbyterian Church in "ghetto ministry" for a couple months. She soon moved on to Philadelphia where she helped start the Welfare Rights Organization. After being fired from her job at the Health and Welfare Council, however, she was hired by the Diocese of Pennsylvania as a Suburban Missioner to organize suburban Episcopalians around social issues in the city. She left that position in 1972 to become a consultant for the Episcopal Consortium of Theological Education in the Northeast, where she taught classes in women's studies. After General Convention failed to approve women's ordination to the priesthood in 1970, Hiatt became active in working to achieve approval at the 1973 convention, and she was ordained a deacon on June 19, 1971, in the Diocese of Pennsylvania. That same year, she published Women Priests: Yes or No? along with Emily Hewitt. With opposition to women's ordination growing, Robert DeWitt proposed ordaining Hiatt as a priest at ETS in December 1973 without the church's blessing. While the ordination was called off and other events were taking place, Hiatt decided to organize separate actions with a few sympathetic bishops and other supporters. On July 10, 1974, Hiatt helped to organize a meeting in Philadelphia to plan an ordination service for women at the Church of the Advocate, where she was serving as a deacon. Because of her role in planning and orchestrating this service, Hiatt has become known as the "Bishop of the Philadelphia Eleven." After her ordination as a priest, Hiatt was hired along with Carter Heyward as a professor at Episcopal Divinity School, where she received tenure in 1981. Hiatt was the John Seely Stone Professor of Homiletics and Pastoral Theology at the seminary from 1993 until her retirement in 1999, also becoming the acting director of the Congregational Studies Program in 1997. Hiatt died of cancer at the age of 65 in 2002.

7. Marie Moorefield Fleischer was born in Baltimore, Maryland, in 1944. She received a B.A. from Wake Forest University in 1966 before attending Union Theological Seminary and Vanderbilt University, where she received her M.Div. in 1970. She was ordained as a deacon on June 9, 1973, in the Diocese of New York. Following her ordination to the priesthood, like many of the other women she found her priesthood rejected by many. For fear of being defrocked she left the Episcopal Church in 1975 and became a minister in the United Methodist Church. She served as the chaplain at the United Methodist Retirement Home in Topeka, Kansas from 1973 to 1975 and the chaplain supervisor at Richmond Memorial Hospital in Richmond, Virginia, from 1977 to 1979 Moorefield returned to the Episcopal Church in the 1980s, serving at churches in Maryland and West Virginia. She served as the Canon for Ministry in the Diocese of Western New York from 1992 to 1996, interim minister for a number of years, and Canon to the Ordinary in the Diocese of North Carolina from 2001 to 2006. In 1980 she married astronomer Robert Fleischer, who died in 2001.

8. Jeannette Ridlon Piccard was born in Chicago, Illinois in 1895. At eleven years old she told her mother that she wanted to be a priest when she grew up. She received a B.A. in philosophy and psychology from Bryn Mawr College in 1918 followed by an M.A. in organic chemistry from the University of Chicago in 1919. That same year she married one of her professors, Jean Felix Piccard. The Piccards taught at the University of Lausanne from 1919 to 1926, when they returned to the United States. Jean had invented cluster high-altitude balloons, and together they invented the plastic balloon which would rise into the stratosphere. Because her husband suffered from acrophobia, he remained seated in the gondola from where he advised Jeannette as she piloted their plastic high altitude hot air balloon into the stratosphere in 1934. Together they ascended above Lake Erie to a height of 10.9 miles. Jeannette Piccard became the first woman licensed as a hot air balloon pilot in the United States and the first woman to pilot a stratosphere-capable balloon to that height, and thus she has been called "the first woman in space". After her husband's death, Jeannette worked as consultant to the director of NASA's Johnson Space Center for a number of years. She was posthumously inducted into the International Space Hall of Fame in 1998. In 1942, Piccard earned her Ph.D. in education from the University of Minnesota and began serving as the executive secretary of housing for the Minnesota Office of Civil Defense. Later she would serve as an aeronautical consultant to General Mills and NASA. On June 29, 1971, Piccard was ordained a deacon in the Episcopal Church. She completed a certificate of study at General Theological Seminary in 1973, and became the first woman ordained as a priest in the Episcopal Church at the service in Philadelphia in 1974 when she was 79 years old, and would go on to function as a parish priest for seven years before her death. Piccard served as a priest associate at St. Philip's Church in Saint Paul, Minnesota and on her death bed was made an honorary canon of St. Mark's Cathedral in Minneapolis. Piccard died of cancer in Minneapolis in 1981.

9. Betty Bone Schiess was born in Cincinnati, Ohio, in 1923. She earned a B.A. from the University of Cincinnati in 1945 followed by an M.A. from Syracuse University in 1947. She also married her husband William Schiess in 1947. Ordained a deacon on June 25, 1972, in the Diocese of Central New York, Schiess served as curate at Grace Episcopal Church in Baldwinsville, New York, from 1972 to 1973. She served as executive director of the Mizpah Educational and Cultural Center for the Aging in Syracuse, New York, from 1973 to 1984. Following her ordination to the priesthood in 1974, she filed a lawsuit with support from assemblywoman Constance Cook against Ned Cole, Bishop of Central New York, charging him with sex discrimination for refusing to recognize her ordination and preventing her from serving as a parish priest in the diocese. The suit was dropped when General Convention approved women's ordination in 1976. Schiess then served college ministries and churches in Syracuse, Ithaca, and Mexico, New York, retiring in 1990. She was the adviser to Women in Mission and Ministry in the Episcopal Church beginning in 1987. She was the recipient of the Governor's Award for Women of Merit in Religion in 1984 and of the Ralph E. Kharas Award for Distinguished Service in Civil Liberties of the Central New York Chapter of the New York Civil Liberties Union in 1986. In 1994 she was inducted into the National Women's Hall of Fame for her efforts in making it possible for girls and women to serve in all levels of the church.

10. Katrina Martha van Alstyne Welles Swanson was born in Boston, Massachusetts, in 1935, the daughter, granddaughter, and great-granddaughter of Episcopal clergy. She earned her B.A. in sociology from Radcliffe College in 1956 and married Episcopal priest George Swanson in 1958. The family spent a year in Botswana through an exchange program in 1966, where her witness of the inequality between the sexes in the church led her to become a champion for women's leadership and ordination. She returned to the United States determined to become a priest. Swanson was ordained as a deacon in the Diocese of West Missouri on September 19, 1971. She served as a deacon at her husband's parish in Kansas City until her ordination to the priesthood in 1974 by her father, when she was suspended by her diocese and her husband was forced to fire her. Then St. Stephen's, a poor parish in St. Louis, decided to hire her as an assistant for a dollar a year in 1975. In 1978, Swanson became the first female rector in the tri-state New York metro area when she was hired as the rector of St. John's Episcopal Church in Union City, New Jersey, where she served until retiring in 1995. She died in 2005 from colon cancer.

11. Nancy Constantine Hatch Wittig was born in Takoma Park, Maryland, in 1945. She earned a B.A. from the University of North Carolina at Chapel Hill in 1969 followed by an M.Div. from Virginia Theological Seminary in 1972. She married Methodist minister Richard Wittig in 1971 and was ordained a deacon in the Diocese of Newark on September 8, 1973. She served in parishes in New Jersey until her ordination to the priesthood in 1974 when she resigned because of a lack of confidence in her and the church's inability to affirm her priesthood. She spent several years raising her family before reentering parish ministry in New Jersey, serving as rector of St. John the Divine Episcopal Church in Hasbrouck Heights from 1982 to 1988. She then taught as an adjunct professor of pastoral theology at General Theological Seminary from 1988 to 1990. From 1992 to 2006 she served as rector of St. Andrew's in the Field in Philadelphia, Pennsylvania and has been rector of St. Peter's in Lakewood, Ohio, since 2006.

The four women (previously ordained as deacons) who were ordained to the priesthood at the Church of St. Stephen and the Incarnation in Washington, D.C. on September 7, 1975, and are known as the Washington Four are:

1. Eleanor Lee McGee-Street was born in Baltimore, Maryland, in 1943. She earned a B.A. from Maryland State College in 1965 and an M.A. from Yale University in 1969, after which she moved to Washington, D.C., to serve as chaplain at American University. McGee was the first female chaplain and assistant director of campus ministry at American University's multi-denominational Kay Spiritual Life Center from 1972 to 1980. She was married to Episcopal priest Kyle McGee in 1968 and ordained as a deacon in the Diocese of Washington on October 27, 1974. While working at American University, she earned an M.S.W. from The Catholic University of America in 1980. The family moved to Hartford, Connecticut, in 1981 where she worked as a priest and social worker with the chronically mentally ill, a private practice psychologist, an associate chaplain at Trinity College, and a part-time professor at Yale Divinity School. In 1987 McGee was hired as rector of St. Paul's & St. James Episcopal Church in New Haven as well as assistant professor at Berkeley Divinity School at Yale. She was remarried in 2000 to Episcopal priest Parke Street. Since retiring from Yale in 1997, she has lectured and led conferences on preaching, discernment, and Christian spirituality.

2. Alison "Tally" Palmer was born in Medford, Massachusetts, in 1931. She earned her B.A. from Brown University in 1953, after which she worked as a writer for The Christian Science Monitor and The New York Times. Palmer began working for the State Department as a clerk typist in 1955 and was appointed as a Foreign Service Officer in 1960, working in Ghana, Congo, Kenya, British Guiana, Ethiopia, Angola, and Vietnam. In 1965 she was refused appointment as an ambassador to Tanzania or Uganda due to being a woman, so she filed a grievance with the State Department for sex discrimination which was found in her favor in 1969. In 1970, Palmer completed an M.A. in African Studies from Boston University. She continued fighting against sex discrimination in the State Department, receiving retroactive pay and a promotion in 1975 and finally winning a class-action lawsuit against the department in 1987. While serving in the Belgian Congo in 1962, Palmer underwent a religious conversion and became a Christian. She later felt a call from the Holy Spirit to become a priest while working in Vietnam in 1969. Palmer did her theological training at Virginia Theological Seminary and was the first woman ordained as deacon in the Diocese of Washington on June 9, 1974, after which she served at St. Columba's Episcopal Church until being ordained as a priest the following year. Since retiring from the State Department in 1981, Palmer has served as an associate at the Chapel of St. James the Fisherman in Wellfleet, Massachusetts and later at Church of the Holy Spirit in Orleans, Massachusetts. Palmer was the first woman to celebrate Holy Communion in the Church of England, in 1977.

3. Elizabeth "Betty" Powell (known as Betty Rosenberg at the time of her priestly ordination) was born in Wilmington, Delaware in 1945. She attended Mount Holyoke College and the University of Delaware, where she received a B.A. in 1967. She continued her education at the University of North Carolina in Chapel Hill where she received an M.S. in 1969 and started to explore a call to ordained ministry. She entered the ordination process while at Virginia Theological Seminary, graduating with an M.Div. in 1972. Active in the struggle for women's ordination, Powell helped form the Episcopal Women's Caucus. She was ordained as a deacon in the Diocese of Washington on June 22, 1974, the first woman ordained at Washington National Cathedral. After her ordination to the priesthood in 1975, she served in the chaplains' department at Georgetown University before becoming an assistant at St. Philip's Episcopal Church in Laurel, Maryland and then an associate at Grace Episcopal Church in Washington, D.C. Powell was the first Episcopal woman to earn a D.Min. from an Episcopal seminary at Bexley Hall in 1975. She left parish ministry to specialize in pastoral counseling and to continue the work of affirming the Feminine Divine. Currently Powell is writing a book with the working title,"In Her Image: Women's Full Authority Reflected in the Feminine Divine."

4. Diane Catherine Baldwin Tickell was born in Fitchburg, Massachusetts in 1918. She received a B.A. from Smith College in 1939 and moved to southeast Alaska after marrying Albert Tickell in 1944. She served as a social worker in Juneau before attending seminary at the Episcopal Theological School where she graduated in 1973. Tickell was ordained as a deacon in 1973 in the Diocese of Alaska. She served as an itinerant deacon at St. Philip's Episcopal Church in Wrangell, Alaska, until her ordination to the priesthood in 1975. After becoming a priest she continued to serve the church in Alaska for many years. Tickell died at the age of 84 in 2002.

- Phyllis Agnes Edwards had originally planned on being ordained along with the Washington Four in 1975. Edwards was born in Chicago, Illinois, in 1917. She earned B.S. and M.S. degrees in education from Black Hills Teachers College in 1951 and 1956 while teaching elementary school and raising four children. After the death of her husband Thomas Edwards she entered Seabury-Western Theological Seminary to become prepare for ordination to the diaconate, having wanted to be a priest as well since the age of 13. She graduated and was ordained to the diaconate in 1964 in the Diocese of Olympia. The following year James Pike, Bishop of California, acknowledged her ordination as a deacon, an action which cast a bold light on the discriminatory and anachronistic word, "deaconess," emphasizing the need to eliminate the segregating and discriminatory canon on women ordained as deacons, all of whom considered themselves to be such, and were so regarded by the bishops who had ordained them, in many cases some decades earlier going back through the twentieth century. Pike also commissioned Edwards to join civil rights movement leader Martin Luther King Jr. in his 1965 Selma to Montgomery marches. Edwards later served as the acting vicar of St. Aidan's Episcopal Church in San Francisco from 1969 to 1970 and as an assistant at St. Matthew's Episcopal Church in Evanston, Illinois, a hospital chaplain, and a campus minister at Northern Illinois University. On June 29, 1980, she was ordained as a priest in the Diocese of Newark where she worked as the director of the diocesan summer camping program. Edwards later moved to Washington state where she served as an assistant at St. Paul's Episcopal Church in Bremerton. She died at the age of 92 in 2009.

== A changed Episcopal Church ==
In addition to having women deacons and priests and bishops the ordination struggles affected people's theological understanding as found in their many writings, sermons, poems and actions. Alla Bozarth wrote a memoir and has published numerous poems; Carter Heyward has also published numerous books. After Sue Hiatt died in 2002, Carter Heyward collected some of her writings and sermons in The Spirit of the Lord is Upon Me: The Writings of Suzanne Hiatt. Betty Bone Schiess posed her key question, in Why Me Lord? One Woman's Ordination to the Priesthood with Commentary and Complaint. Alison Palmer, one of the Washington Four, published her appropriately titled Diplomat and Priest: One Woman's Challenges to State and Church. Ordaining Bishop Welles wrote The Happy Disciple: An Autobiography of Edward Randolph Welles II and Paul Washington, rector of the Church of the Advocate wrote "Other Sheep I Have:" The Autobiography of Father Paul Washington. These books focused on their personal journeys. Cameron Partridge considers the theological implications of these ordinations in his "Toward an 'Irregular' Embrace: The Philadelphia Ordinations and Transforming Ideas of the Human." Paula Nesbitt analyzed the "Feminization of the Clergy and the Future: Sociological Reflections," in a series of essays in Looking Forward, Looking Backward: Forty Years of Women's Ordination.

== Documentary ==
A documentary, The Philadelphia Eleven, was released in 2023. It features archival and news footage, and interviews with many of the surviving priests.
