= Alison Palmer =

American priest and diplomat (born 1931)

The Reverend Alison Palmer
- Born: November 22, 1931 (age 95); Medford, Massachusetts
- Education: Pembroke College, Brown University (B.A., 1953); Boston University (M.A., 1970)
- Occupation: Foreign Service officer
- Years active: 1960–1981

Ecclesiastical career
- Church: Episcopal Church
- Ordained: September 7, 1975

Alison "Tally" Palmer (born November 22, 1931) is an American priest in the Episcopal Church and a retired United States Foreign Service officer. Early in her career in the Foreign Service, Palmer faced sex discrimination. She was awarded retroactive pay and promotion in 1971, and won a class action lawsuit against the State Department regarding its employment practices in 1987. In 1975, Palmer became one of the first women to be irregularly ordained as an Episcopal priest as part of the Washington Four.

== Early life ==
Alison Palmer was born on November 22, 1931, in Medford, Massachusetts. She was raised on Long Island, New York. Her mother, Lois Mead Patten Palmer, was a 1927 graduate of Pembroke College, Brown University and a kindergarten teacher. C.B. Palmer, her father, was a writer. Palmer graduated from near the top of her class at Lynbrook High School in 1949 and attended her mother's alma mater, Pembroke College, on a full scholarship. She graduated in 1953 with a bachelor of arts, majoring in English literature and minoring in Latin.

== Foreign Service career ==
In 1955, after failing the Foreign service examination, Palmer entered the United States Department of State as a clerk typist in Ghana. Palmer was promoted twice in Ghana and then assigned to the State Department personnel office in Washington, D.C. In 1958, Palmer passed the Foreign Service examination, but her supervisor removed her name from the incoming Foreign Service officer list so that she would remain a secretary. After protesting, Palmer was appointed as a Foreign Service officer in the State Department in January 1960.

Palmer's first post as a Foreign Service officer was as vice consul in Léopoldville, Belgian Congo, at the start of the Congo Crisis in June 1960. During her time in the newly independent Congo, Palmer and others saved the lives of her diplomatic colleagues—including then-political officer Frank Carlucci—by driving into the middle of a mob that was trying to kill them for running over a child, pulling a man into her car, and driving away. In another instance, Palmer saved a group of three journalists by walking into a group of Congolese soldiers and invoking her consular authority. From 1960 to 1965, Palmer was promoted three times, reflecting exemplary service. In 1965, she was selected by the State Department for advanced training in African affairs at Boston University so that she could become a political officer.

In 1966, the ambassadors to three African nations refused her posts because she was a woman. She was first not allowed to serve at the Embassy of the United States, Dar es Salaam, Tanzania, and the Embassy of the United States, Kampala, Uganda. When she was finally allowed to serve as a political officer in the Embassy of the United States, Addis Ababa, Ethiopia, the ambassador directed her to work as his wife's social secretary instead. In 1967, Palmer was finally allowed to serve as political officer and was promoted.

From 1968 to 1970, Palmer served during the Vietnam War as chief of the Report Branch and political advisor for the Civil Operations and Revolutionary Development Support program in the II Corps Tactical Zone. In 1970, she earned an M.A. in African Studies from Boston University. Palmer retired from the Foreign Service in 1981.

=== Sex discrimination complaints and litigation ===
In 1968, Palmer filed the first equal employment opportunity complaint alleging sex discrimination with the State Department's Equal Employment Office. Palmer alleged that she had missed out on promotion based on the three African ambassadors' actions against her. The Office sustained her complaint against the three ambassadors in 1969, but failed to place the report in her file. Palmer thereafter demanded a retroactive promotion and reforms to the State Department's equal employment opportunity policies. She also wanted the State Department to discipline the ambassadors. In 1971, Palmer appealed to the Civil Service Commission, which awarded her retroactive pay and promotion. The State Department conceded that it had discriminated against Palmer, but refused some of her requests for reform.

Palmer used her retroactive pay award to fund a class action lawsuit alleging sex discrimination against the State Department in 1976. She won the lawsuit in 1987. The court issued several orders to implement reform in the State Department. The case was finally settled and dismissed in 2010.

== Episcopal Church service ==
Palmer was baptized into the Episcopal Church in 1962 while she was posted in the Belgian Congo. She was confirmed in 1963. While serving in Vietnam in 1969, she began to study the Bible and theology and decided to join the priesthood. In 1971, she began study as a postulant in Washington, D.C., taking night classes at the Virginia Theological Seminary. She also began to provide pastoral care to her colleagues in the Foreign Service. In 1974, she was ordained as a deacon.

Palmer and three other women—known as the Washington Four—were irregularly ordained as priests in the Episcopal Church on September 7, 1975, by George W. Barrett, the former Bishop of Rochester, at St. Stephen and the Incarnation Episcopal Church in Washington, D.C. The Episcopal Church recognized their ordinations in 1977.

== Sources ==
- "Alison Palmer". The Archives of the Episcopal Church. For the Extension of the Kingdom. 2024. Archived from the original on December 22, 2024.
- Calkin, Homer L. (1978). Women in the Department of State: Their Role in American Foreign Affairs (Report). Washington, D.C.: United States Government Printing Office. United States Department of State Publication 8951. Department and Foreign Service Series 166. U.S. Government Printing Office Stock No. 044-000-01707-5 – via Internet Archive.
- Huyck, Heather (2024). "'No Longer Unique': The Significance of the Washington 1975 Ordinations". Anglican and Episcopal History. 93 (2): 355–380. JSTOR 27316617. ProQuest 3059470814.
- McKenzie, Beatrice Loftus (2015). "The Problem of Women in the Department: Sex and Gender Discrimination in the 1960s United States Foreign Diplomatic Service". European Journal of American Studies. 10 (1). doi:10.4000/ejas.10589. Archived from the original on September 7, 2025.
- Cameron, Ruth Tonkiss; Riggs, Kristy (September 23, 2016) [2010-12-22]. Finding Aid for Alison Palmer Papers, 1937–2010 (PDF). The Archive of Women in Theological Scholarship. Columbia University Libraries. Archived (PDF) from the original on September 11, 2024.
- Strano, Andrea (March 2016). "Foreign Service Women Today: The Palmer Case and Beyond". The Foreign Service Journal. Vol. 93, no. 2. pp. 24–28. Archived from the original on September 20, 2024.
