= Richard J. Watson =

American artist

- Born: 1946; Badin, North Carolina
- Known for: Painter, printmaker
- Website: watsonartforyou.com

Richard J. Watson (born 1946) is an American artist. He was born in Badin, North Carolina. He attended the Pennsylvania Academy of the Fine Arts. In the 1970s, he collaborated with Walter Edmonds to create murals for the Church of the Advocate in Philadelphia, which was a center of activity for the civil rights movement in North Philadelphia. The church commissioned them to paint murals for the interior. They were requested to portray a combination of Black history and themes from the Bible. They were active in the Church of the Advocate and they donated their time to create the murals. 14 murals were completed from 1973 to 1976. Titles include "Creation", "I Have a Dream", "The Lord smote the firstborn in the land of Egypt" and "God has chosen the weak to confound the strong".

Watson's work was included in the 2015 exhibition We Speak: Black Artists in Philadelphia, 1920s–1970s at the Woodmere Art Museum. In 2021, the African American Museum in Philadelphia held an exhibition of his work entitled Portals+Revelations – Richard J. Watson Beyond Realities.

His work is in the Pennsylvania Academy of the Fine Arts and the Petrucci Family Foundation.
