= Jacqueline Means =

First woman to be ordained an Episcopal priest

Jacqueline Allene Means (1936–2025) was an American Anglican priest. On January 1, 1977, she became the first woman to be regularly ordained a priest in the Episcopal Church in the United States of America. The Episcopal Church's General Convention had approved the ordination of women to the priesthood in September 1976, and this had come into force on New Year's Day 1977. Women had been ordained in 1974 and 1975 (the Philadelphia Eleven and the Washington Four), but as this was without the approval of the General Convention, their ordinations were declared irregular.

Jacqueline Allene Ehringer was born on August 26, 1936, in Peoria, Illinois, to Minnett M. and Theodore R. Ehringer. Her father was a traveling salesman and both of her parents were alcoholics. She attended Roman Catholic schools and dropped out at the age of 16 to marry Delton Means, a truck driver. They had four children and attended an Episcopal church. After passing a high school equivalency test, she became a licensed practical nurse. She later enrolled in seminary courses in Indianapolis.

At the Episcopal church's General Convention of 1976, it was decided that women could be ordained at all orders of ministry. During the first regular ordination of Episcopal women priests in 1977, Means was the first to be ordained. During her ordination, at the All Saints' Church in Indianapolis, a man condemned the proceedings as "heresy" and about a dozen people walked out.

Means divorced her husband in 1979 and married minister David H. Bratsch. She rose to associate pastor by 1982.

Rev. Means served as rector in Plainfield, Indiana, from 1986 until 1998. Since 1999, she directed prison ministries in the Office of the Bishop for the Armed Forces, Health Services and Prison Ministries. In 2001, Rev. Means received an honorary degree from the Church Divinity School of the Pacific.

Means died in 2025.
