= Sarah Willie-LeBreton =

American sociologist and academic administrator

12th President of Smith College
- Incumbent
- Assumed office July 1, 2023
- Preceded by: Kathleen McCartney

Personal details
- Relatives: Charles V. Willie (father)
- Education: Haverford College (BA); Northwestern University (MA, PhD)

Academic background
- Thesis: When We Were Black: The College Experiences of Post-Civil Rights Era African-Americans (1995)
- Doctoral advisor: Charles M. Payne

Academic work
- Discipline: Sociology
- Institutions: Colby College; Bard College; Swarthmore College; Smith College

Sarah Susannah Willie-LeBreton is an American sociologist and academic administrator who has been the 12th president of Smith College since 2023. She was previously the provost and dean of faculty at Swarthmore College from 2018 to 2023.

== Life ==
The daughter of sociologist Charles Vert Willie, Willie-LeBreton attended high school in Concord, Massachusetts. She earned a B.A. from Haverford College in 1986. She completed a semester at Spelman College during her undergraduate studies. She earned a M.A. (1988) and Ph.D. (1995) in sociology from Northwestern University. Her dissertation was titled, When We Were Black: The College Experiences of Post-Civil Rights Era African-Americans. Charles M. Payne, Arlene Kaplan Daniels, and Aldon Morris served as her committee members.

Willie-LeBreton taught at Colby College from 1991 to 1995 and Bard College from 1995 to 1997. She served as the coordinator of the Black Studies program for 11 years and chair of the department of sociology and anthropology for 6 years at Swarthmore College. In 2018, she was appointed provost and dean of faculty. On July 1, 2023, Willie-LeBreton became the 12th president of Smith College, succeeding Kathleen McCartney. She was officially inaugurated as president on October 21, 2023. She is the second African American in the role after Ruth Simmons who served from 1995 to 2001.

In 2026 Willie-LeBreton was elected chair of the Board of Directors of the Association of Independent Colleges and Universities in Massachusetts, a consortium of 56 private colleges and universities located in Massachusetts.

== Selected works ==
- Willie, Sarah Susannah (2003). Acting Black: College, Identity, and the Performance of Race. Routledge. ISBN 978-0-415-94409-0.
- Willie-LeBreton, Sarah, ed. (2016). Transforming the Academy: Faculty Perspectives on Diversity and Pedagogy. Rutgers University Press. ISBN 978-0-8135-6508-8.
