= Kathleen McCartney (academic) =

American academic administrator and psychologist

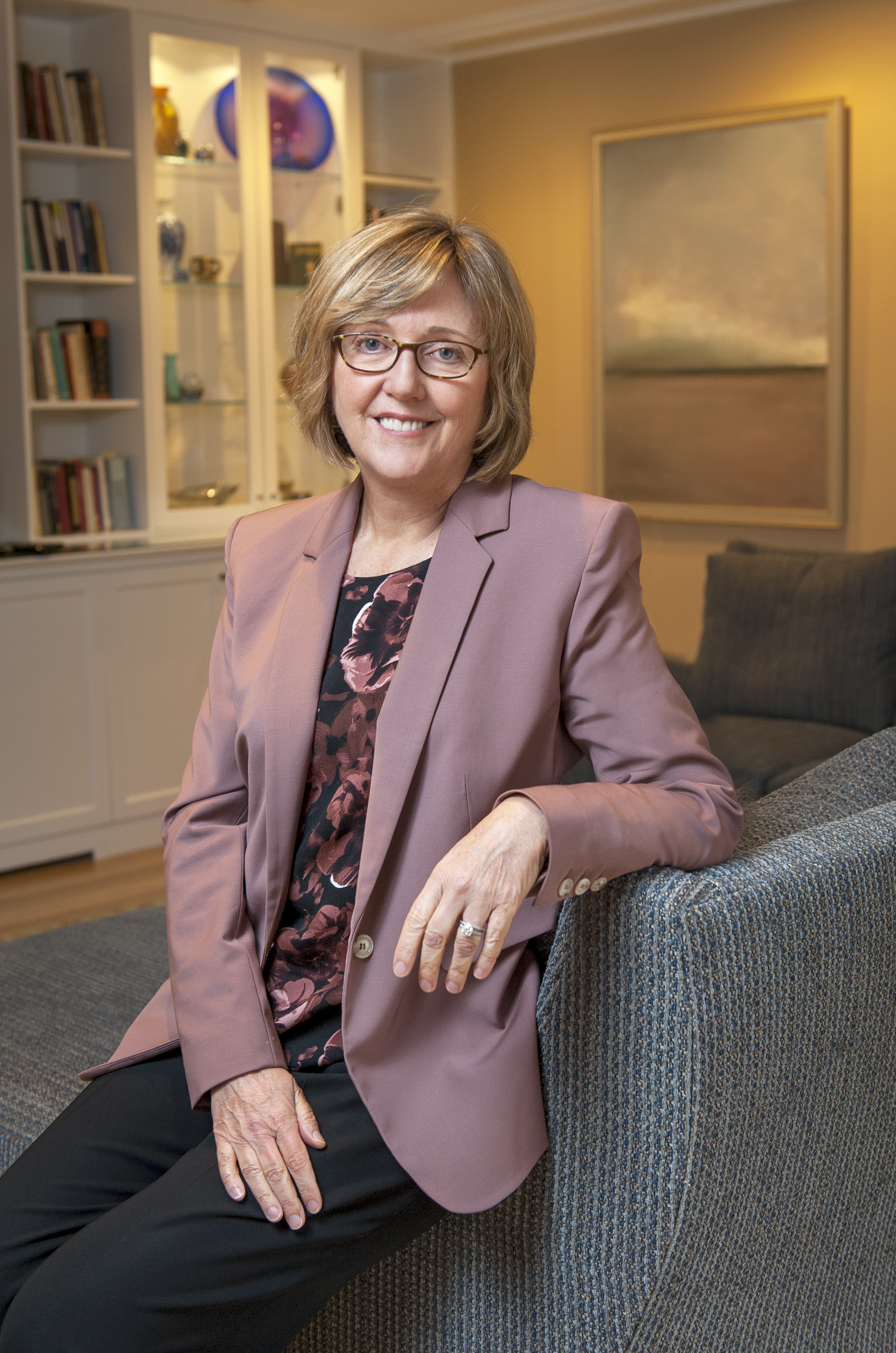
- McCartney in 2014

11th President of Smith College
- In office July 1, 2013 – June 30, 2023
- Preceded by: Carol T. Christ
- Succeeded by: Sarah Willie-LeBreton

Personal details
- Born: 1956 (age 69–70) Medford, Massachusetts, U.S.
- Education: Tufts University (BA); Yale University (MA, PhD)
- Profession: Psychologist

Academic background
- Thesis: The Effect of Quality of Day Care Environment Upon Children's Language Development (1982)
- Doctoral advisor: Sandra Scarr

Academic work
- Discipline: Psychology
- Sub-discipline: child development
- Institutions: Harvard University; Smith College

Kathleen McCartney (born 1956) is an American academic administrator, who served as the 11th president of Smith College. She took office as Smith's president in June 2013. Smith College, located in Northampton, Massachusetts, is a liberal arts college and one of the Seven Sisters colleges. In February 2023, McCartney announced that she planned to retire at end of June 2023. She has since left Smith College.

== Early life and education ==
McCartney was born in Medford, Massachusetts. She obtained a Bachelor of Science summa cum laude with a major in psychology from Tufts University in 1977. She then received a Master of Philosophy in psychology in 1979 and a Ph.D. in psychology in 1982 from Yale University.

== Career ==
McCartney came to Smith from the Harvard Graduate School of Education, where she was dean, and the Gerald S. Lesser Professor in Early Childhood Development. During her tenure at Harvard, the school introduced a three-year doctorate in educational leadership in collaboration with the Harvard Business School and Kennedy School of Government. Prior teaching and research experience includes service as a tenured associate professor of psychology and family studies as well as director of the Child Study and Development Center at the University of New Hampshire.

In her role as President of Smith College, McCartney launched initiatives on college access and affordability, design thinking, and the liberal arts, women in STEM and the capacities women need to succeed and lead. During her tenure, Smith engaged architectural designer Maya Lin to redesign the historic Neilson Library. The building was completed during the COVID-19 pandemic and opened for use by Smith students and faculty in March 2021.

== Research and academic interests ==
McCartney's research has focused on early experience and development, particularly with respect to child care, early childhood education, and poverty. She has published more than 150 articles and book chapters on those topics and was the principal researcher for Child Care and Child Development, a 20-year study published in 2005 that examined whether early and extensive child care disrupted the mother-child relationship. She co-edited Experience and Development, The Blackwell Handbook of Early Childhood Development, and Best Practices in Developmental Research Methods. In 1983, McCartney and Sandra Scarr published a developmental theory of gene-environment correlation.

McCartney has written extensively on issues of gender, education and parenting, including essays and letters in The New York Times, The Wall Street Journal, Worth, CNN, The Boston Globe, and HuffPost.

McCartney is a fellow of the American Academy of Arts and Sciences, the American Educational Research Association, the American Psychological Association, and the American Psychological Society.

== Awards and honors ==
A developmental psychologist, McCartney was the recipient in 2009 of the Distinguished Contribution Award from the Society for Research in Child Development. In 2011 The Boston Globe named her one of the 30 most innovative people in Massachusetts. In 2013, she received the Harvard College Women's Professional Achievement Award, which honors an individual who has demonstrated exceptional leadership in her professional field. In March 2015, she was elected to the board of directors of the American Council on Education (ACE). The Boston Business Journal named her one of its 2016 Women of Influence, citing her extensive work on early childhood education.

Academic offices
Preceded by Carol T. Christ	11th President of Smith College; 2013 – 2023	Succeeded by Sarah Willie-LeBreton
