= Betty Bone Schiess =

American Episcopal priest

Betty Bone Schiess (April 2, 1923 – October 20, 2017) was an American Episcopal priest. She was one of the first female Episcopal priests in the United States, and a member of the Philadelphia Eleven: leaders of the movement to allow the ordination of women in the American Episcopal Church.

== Early life and education ==
Betty Bone was born on April 2, 1923, in Cincinnati, Ohio to Leah and Evan Bone. She attended Hillsdale College Preparatory School where she was president of the student body in her senior year.^{p. 7} She then attended the University of Cincinnati and was the chaplain for Delta Delta Delta.^{p. 8} Bone earned her BA in 1945. After graduating, she worked in the personnel department at Wright-Patterson Field.^{pp. 8–9}

Bone earned her master's degree in 1947 from Syracuse University. She married William A. Schiess the same year and lived with him in Algiers for several weeks. She later wrote that they returned from their travels determined to "do something about the plight of the Negro." They took part in demonstrations and marches in the Southern United States.^{pp. 158–159}

During the late 1960s, Schiess worked with the Syracuse National Organization for Women chapter to reform the Episcopal church. She earned her Master of Divinity degree in 1972 from the Rochester Center for Theological Studies but was denied ordination due to her sex. In 1974 the Episcopal Church did not allow women to be ordained: efforts at two general conventions of bishops had failed. Schiess credited Betty Friedan's 1965 book The Feminine Mystique and the foundation of a chapter of the National Organization for Women in Syracuse with inspiring her to pursue priesthood and change in the Episcopal Church.

== Ordination ==
Schiess and 10 other women, later known as the Philadelphia Eleven, were ordained in Pennsylvania by a group of retired bishops on July 29, 1974. Emily Hewitt, a friend of Schiess's from the Episcopal Peace Fellowship had asked her to join the group.^{p. 145} The ordainments were "irregular", meaning that they would need to be approved. They were later charged in ecclesiastical court.

The Episcopal Diocese of Central New York refused to grant Schiess a license to perform priestly duties. In 1976, lawyer and New York State Assembly member Constance Cook acted as Schiess's advocate in filing a suit with the Equal Employment Opportunity Commission (EEOC/EEO), who issued a decision favoring Schiess. The General Convention of the Episcopal Church in the United States of America passed a resolution in July 1976 that "no one shall be denied access" to ordination in the church based on gender.

In November 1976, Ned Cole, the bishop who had blocked Schiess' ordination, indicated that he would have her ordained in ceremonies to be held in January 1977. and in 1977, the church voted to permit the ordination of women. Schiess was chaplain at Syracuse from 1976 to 1978 and at Cornell from 1978 to 1979. One of the first weddings where Schiess officiated as priest was that of James Brule and Jill Woiler in 1975.

== Later career ==
Schiess continued to advocate for change in the church. In 1983, she stated "the churches still aren't thinking twice about women's well being."

She later became rector of Grace Episcopal Church in Mexico, New York and was a member of the New York Task Force on Life and Law.

In 1985, Joseph Agonito portrayed her story in the documentary film Woman Priest: A Portrait of the Rev. Betty Bone Schiess.^{p. 21}

She was president of the International Association of Women Ministers.

In 1994 she served on the Governor of New York's task force on bioethical issues. That same year she was inducted into the National Women's Hall of Fame.

In 2002 Schiess and tax resistor Margaret Rusk received the inaugural In the Spirit of Gage awards presented by the Matilda Joslyn Gage Foundation.

She is the author of the 2003 book Why Me, Lord?: One Woman's Ordination to the Priesthood With Commentary and Complaint.

Schiess lived in Cicero, New York, until her death on October 20, 2017.

== Works ==
- Take Back the Church, Indeed the Witness (1982)
- Creativity and Procreativity: Some Thoughts on Eve and the Opposition and How Episcopalians Make Ethical Decisions (1988)
- Schiess, Betty Bone (2003). Why Me, Lord?: One Woman's Ordination to the Priesthood with Commentary and Complaint (1st ed.). New York: Syracuse University Press. ISBN 978-0-8156-0744-1.

== See also ==
- Ordination of women
