= Charles V. Willie =

American sociologist (1927–2022)

- Born: October 8, 1927; Dallas, Texas
- Died: January 11, 2022 (aged 94); Brighton, Massachusetts
- Occupation: Professor
- Spouse: Mary Sue Willie
- Children: 3; including Sarah Willie-LeBreton

Academic background
- Education: Morehouse College; Atlanta University; Syracuse University
- Thesis: Socio-economic and ethnic areas of Syracuse, New York. (1957)

Academic work
- Discipline: Sociology
- Sub-discipline: desegregation, higher education, public health, race relations, urban community problems
- Institutions: Syracuse University; State University of New York Upstate Medical University; Harvard University

Charles Vert Willie (October 8, 1927 – January 11, 2022) was an American sociologist who was the Charles William Eliot Professor of Education Emeritus at Harvard University. His areas of research included desegregation, higher education, public health, race relations, urban community problems, and family life. Willie considered himself an applied sociologist, concerned with solving social problems.

== Biography ==
Willie was born October 8, 1927, in Dallas, Texas, the grandson of Louis Willie, a former slave. His father, Louis Willie, was a pullman porter. His mother, Carrie Sykes, was one of the first black women to earn a college degree in Texas but could not teach in the segregated Dallas school system because she was married. She, therefore, home-schooled her children until they could ride in the back of the streetcars to their segregated schools.

He received his B.A. from Morehouse College in 1948 where he was class president, an M.A. from Atlanta University in 1949, and his Ph.D. in sociology from Syracuse University in 1957. He was a member of Alpha Phi Alpha fraternity. For many years he resided with his wife Mary Sue Willie in Concord, Massachusetts. He had three children who have careers in government (James Theodore Willie), construction (Martin Charles Willie), and academia (Sarah Willie-LeBreton).

Willie died at his home in Brighton on January 11, 2022, at the age of 94.

== Career ==
Willie became the first tenured African-American professor at Syracuse University where he taught from 1950 to 1974. He served President John F. Kennedy as the Research Director of Washington Action for Youth, a delinquency-prevention planning program in Washington, D.C. sponsored by the President's Committee on Juvenile Delinquency and Youth Crime from 1962 to 1964. He returned to Syracuse University from 1964 to 1966. In July 1961 Willie first brought his Morehouse College classmate, Martin Luther King Jr. to speak at Syracuse, and again in July 1965 he introduced King to an audience of 1,000 at a major speech at Syracuse University. In 1966–67, he was on leave from Syracuse as a Visiting Lecturer in Sociology at the Harvard Medical School in its Department of Psychiatry as part of the Laboratory of Community Psychiatry. He was chairman of the Department of Sociology. He was vice president of student affairs from 1972 to 1974 at Syracuse. At the time he left Syracuse to accept a tenured position as professor of education at Harvard University's Graduate School of Education in 1974.

In 1977, President Jimmy Carter appointed Willie and nineteen others (from among over 1,000 candidates) to the President's Commission on Mental Health.

Willie was a member of the Board of Directors of the Social Science Research Council. He served as vice president of the American Sociological Association and president (1974–75) of the Eastern Sociological Society.

He also served as a consultant, expert witness, and court-appointed master in major school desegregation cases in various large cities including the landmark case of Boston (1974) from which emerged the "Controlled Choice" plan popularized by Willie and Michael Alves and used in Boston for 10 years and Cambridge for 20 years. Willie did desegregation planning work in Hartford, Dallas, Denver, Houston, Kansas City, Little Rock, Milwaukee, San Jose, Seattle, and St. Louis; and in other municipalities such as St. Lucie County and Lee County, Florida, and Somerville, Cambridge, and Brockton, Massachusetts.

Willie was a lay member of the Episcopal Church in the United States, a former member of its Executive Council and a past vice president of the House of Deputies, one of two houses, with the House of Bishops, that makes up the General Convention of the Episcopal Church in the United States of America. Willie was the first African-American elected as vice-president of the House of Deputies (1970). Although a lay member of this religious association, he was invited to deliver the ordination sermon at an irregular service held in Philadelphia, Pennsylvania at the Church of the Advocate, July 29, 1974 in which the first eleven women were ordained as priests in this denomination. Some members of the Episcopal Church were reluctant to acknowledge the priesthood of women, and the ordination was disputed. Meeting in an emergency session in Chicago, the House of Bishops invalidated the ordination by a vote of 128 to 9 because the four officiating bishops had "not fulfilled constitutional and canonical requirements." Willie then resigned on August 18, 1974, his elected office of vice-president, in protest at the Bishops' failure to uphold the ordination and accord women equal rights. Ms. magazine designated him a male hero in its tenth-anniversary issue (August 1982). He and forty other men were honored for taking courageous action on behalf of women.

== Awards and honors ==
In 2004 Willie received the American Sociological Association's William Foote Whyte Distinguished Career Award; in 2005 he was co-recipient with Charles Tilly of the ASA's W. E. B. DuBois Career of Distinguished Scholarship Award. He had previously received in 1994 the ASA's DuBois-Johnson-Frazier Award. In February 2006 Willie received the Eastern Sociological Society Merit Award, the highest award it can bestow on members.

A number of colleges, universities, and seminaries conferred honorary doctoral degrees upon Willie including Syracuse University, 1992; Haverford College, 2000; Episcopal Divinity School, 2004; Emerson College, 2008, Morgan State University, 2013; and Beacon College, 2019. In June 2000 Syracuse University awarded Willie its George Arents Pioneer Medal, SU's highest alumni honor as well as the Chancellor's Citation Lifetime Achievement Award in 2017.

In 2013 the Eastern Sociological Society established an annual award in Dr. Willie's name to be given to a minority graduate student who demonstrates exceptional scholarly promise, "in recognition of Willie's work on racial and ethnic minorities, his support of minority graduate students, and his invaluable contributions to ESS." In 2021 the Harvard University Graduate School of Education renamed a Doctor of Education Leadership fellowship as the Dr. Charles Willie Fellowship. The fellowship provides an Ed.L.D. student with financial support during their three-year doctoral program.

== Partial bibliography ==
Willie was the author or editor of over 100 articles and 30 books on issues of race, gender, socioeconomic status, mental health, religion, education, urban communities, and family relations. Bibliographic citations from OCLC Worldcat.

- Willie, Charles Vert and Richard J. Reddick, A New Look at Black Families. 6th ed. Lanham, Maryland: Rowman & Littlefield, 2010
- Willie, Charles Vert, Steven P. Ridini, and David A. Willard. Grassroots Social Action : Lessons in People Power Movements. Lanham, Maryland: Rowman & Littlefield, 2008.
- Willie, Charles Vert, Richard J. Reddick, and Ron Brown. The Black College Mystique. Lanham, Maryland: Rowman & Littlefield, 2006.
- Willie, Charles Vert and Richard J. Reddick, A New Look at Black Families. 5th ed. Walnut Creek CA: Altamira Press, 2003
- Willie, Charles Vert, Ralph Edwards, and Michael J., Alves, Student diversity, choice and school improvement. Westport, Connecticut : Bergin & Garvey, 2002
- Edwards, Ralph, and Charles Vert Willie. Black power/white Power in Public Education. Westport, Conn: Praeger, 1998.
- Willie, Charles Vert, Michael J. Alves, and Educational Resources Information Center (U.S.). Controlled Choice a New Approach to School Desegregated Education and School Improvement. Providence, Rhode Island; Washington, D.C.: Education Alliance Press and the New England Desegregation Assistance Center, Brown University; U.S. Dept. of Education, Office of Educational Research and Improvement, Educational Resources Information Center, 1996.
- Willie, Charles Vert. Mental Health, Racism, and Sexism. London; Pittsburgh: Taylor & Francis; University of Pittsburgh Press, 1995.
- Willie, Charles Vert. Theories of Human Social Action. Dix Hills, New York: General Hall, Inc, 1994.
- Willie, Charles Vert, et al. The Education of African-Americans. New York: London: Auburn House, 1991.
- Willie, Charles Vert, Michael K. Grady, and Richard O. Hope. African-Americans and the Doctoral Experience : Implications for Policy. New York: Teachers College Press, 1991.
- Willie, Charles Vert. A New Look at Black Families. 4th ed. Dix Hills, New York: General Hall, 1991.
- Willie, Charles Vert, Michael J. Alves, and David J. Hartmann. Long-Range Educational Equity Plan for Milwaukee Public Schools., 1990.
- Willie, Charles Vert. Racism and Mental Health; Essays. Pittsburgh: University of Pittsburgh Press, 1977.
- Willie, Charles Vert, The Caste and Class Controversy on Race and Poverty : Round Two of the Willie/Wilson Debate. 2nd ed. Dix Hills, New York: General Hall, 1989.
- Willie, Charles Vert, and Inabeth Miller. Social Goals and Educational Reform : American Schools in the Twentieth Century. New York: Greenwood Press, 1988.
- Willie, Charles Vert. A New Look at Black Families. 3rd ed. Dix Hills, New York: General Hall, 1988.
- Willie, Charles Vert. Effective Education : A Minority Policy Perspective. New York: Greenwood Press, 1987.
- Grady, Michael K., and Charles Vert Willie. Metropolitan School Desegregation : A Case Study of the Saint Louis Area Voluntary Transfer Program. Bristol, Ind., U.S.A: Wyndham Hall Press, 1986.
- Willie, Charles Vert. Five Black Scholars : An Analysis of Family Life, Education, and Career. Lanham, Md: Abt Books, 1986.
- Willie, Charles Vert. Black and White Families : A Study in Complementarity. Bayside, New York: General Hall, 1985.
- Willie, Charles Vert, and Michael K. Grady. Desegregating Schools in the St. Louis Metropolitan Area : An Analysis of First-Year Effects of a Voluntary Interdistrict Transfer Program : Final Report. Cambridge, Massachusetts: Graduate School of Education. Harvard University, 1985.
- Willie, Charles Vert. School Desegregation Plans that Work. Westport, Conn: Greenwood Press, 1984.
- Willie, Charles Vert. Race, Ethnicity, and Socioeconomic Status : A Theoretical Analysis of their Interrelationship. Bayside, New York General Hall:, 1983.
- Willie, Charles Vert. A New Look at Black Families. 2nd ed. Bayside, New York: General Hall, 1981.
- Willie, Charles Vert. The Ivory and Ebony Towers : Race Relations and Higher Education. Lexington, Mass: Lexington Books, [Aldershot]: Gower (distributor), 1981.
- Willie, Charles Vert, et al. The Stages in a Scholar's Life. Cambridge, Mass: Harvard Graduate School of Education, 1981.
- Willie, Charles Vert, Susan L. Greenblatt, and Joint Author. Community Politics and Educational Change : Ten School Systems Under Court Order. New York: Longman, 1981.
- Willie, Charles Vert. The Caste and Class Controversy. Dix Hills, New York: General Hall, 1979.
- Willie, Charles Vert. The Sociology of Urban Education : Desegregation and Integration. Lexington, Mass: Lexington Books, 1978.
- Willie, Charles Vert, and Ronald R. Edmonds. Black Colleges in America : Challenge, Development, Survival. New York: Teachers College Press, 1978.
- Willie, Charles Vert. Black/brown/white Relations : Race Relations in the 1970s. New Brunswick, New Jersey: Transaction Books, 1977.
- Willie, Charles Vert. A New Look at Black Families. Bayside, New York: General Hall, 1976.
- Willie, Charles Vert. Oreo : A Perspective on Race and Marginal Men and Women. Wakefield, Mass: Parameter Press, 1975.
- Willie, Charles Vert. Perspectives on Contemporary African and Afro-American Development. Nashville, Tennessee: Vanderbilt University, 1975.
- Willie, Charles Vert and Jerome Beker. Race Mixing in the Public Schools. New York: Praeger, 1973.
- Willie, Charles Vert. Racism and Mental Health; Essays. Pittsburgh: University of Pittsburgh Press, 1973.
- Willie, Charles Vert and Arline Sakuma McCord. Black Students at White Colleges. New York: Praeger, 1972.
- Willie, Charles Vert, William A. Darity, Jr., and Population Reference Bureau. Perspectives from the Black Community. Washington, D.C.: The Bureau, 1971.
- Willie, Charles Vert comp. The Family Life of Black People. Columbus, Ohio: Merrill, 1970.
- Willie, Charles Vert. The Student-Teacher Relationships Experienced by Black Students at White Colleges. Syracuse, New York:, 1970.
- Willie, Charles Vert, and Arline F. Sakuma. The Social Life of Black Students on White College Campuses. Syracuse, New York: Dept of Sociology, Syracuse University, 1970.
- Willie, Charles Vert. Church Action in the World; Studies in Sociology and Religion. New York: Morehouse-Barlow Co, 1969.
- Willie, Charles Vert. Socio-economic and ethnic areas, Syracuse and Onondaga County, N.Y., 1960 Syracuse, New York: Syracuse University Youth Development Center, 1962.

Archives

- Charles Vert Willie Papers. 1948–1999. 104 linear feet. Held by the University Archives of Syracuse University .
