= Good Spouses Day =

Unofficial Japanese holiday

Good Spouses Day (いい夫婦の日, ii fūfu no hi) is a celebration held in Japan every year on November 22nd. There is currently no official English name for the day and it has alternatively been called "Good Couples Day" or "Good Husband and Wife Day" in English.

== Overview ==
Good Spouses Day was first proposed by the Leisure Development Center (currently the Japan Productivity Center) in 1988. A committee was established in 1998 to promote Good Spouses Day. Beginning in 2000, public voting is conducted each year to elect the Couple of the Year, a couple who is considered the most ideal. (Note: The Couple of the Year is, in effect, selected from celebrity couples, though the organization's website makes no mention of the candidates being celebrities only.)

The day reached widespread recognition in the 2000s, and more celebrities now submit their marriage registrations on November 22nd. In 2007, the organization leading the celebrations began conducting yearly surveys regarding married relationships.

== Origin ==
November was brought up in a 1985 economic countermeasure meeting as a month with space open for such a day. Additionally, the date is an instance of goroawase because 11/22 (DD/MM) can be read “ii fufu” in Japanese, which sounds like the words “good husband and wife” (ii fūfu).

== Public Reception ==
A 2015 survey by the advertising and marketing company Creative Survey found that, while approximately 80% of respondents were aware of the day, only 4% celebrated it. In contrast, a 2023 survey by En-Musubi University, a dating-information website operated by web and marketing services corporation Next Level, found approximately 50% of respondents planned to do something for Good Spouses Day.

== 2011 Activities ==
With the occurrence of the Tōhoku earthquake that year, the 2011 Good Spouses Day saw many emotional reports in the media of couples impacted by the disaster, resulting in the selection of the theme “Bonds” for the celebrations.

1. Preparations were put in place for “Good Spouses Day Bonds Weddings,” where an open call was held for couples whose weddings had to be canceled or postponed due to the earthquake, with the new weddings held on November 8th.
2. Other events from past years were held again including the Partner of the Year elections, the Good Spouses Senryū Competition, the Good Spouses Walkathon, and the Good Spouses Reading Event.
3. 2011 also saw the start of a two-week long Good Spouses Weeks period prior to Good Spouses Day where several companies ran a variety of campaigns.

== 2012 Activities ==
In response to surveys, organizers acknowledged the need for spouses to strengthen the bonds between them, and so, in 2012, posted tips on how to be a good spouse on Twitter. These tips were also posted on their homepage where they provide information on strengthening the bonds with your spouse.

== 2013 Activities ==
The Senryū Contest and call for Couple of the Year candidates opened on August 1st, the Jewelry Writing Contest opened on August 10th, and the official website was redesigned.

== Couple of the Year Winners ==
Past winners of the Couple of the Year vote.

- 2000 - Shikan Nakamura and Hiroko Mita
- 2001 - Hiroyuki Watanabe and Hideko Hara
- 2002 - Takumi Nishio and Tamomi Nishio
- 2003 - Eiji Okuda and Kazu Andō
- 2004 - Takashi Yamamoto and Suzu Chiba
- 2005 - Kinya Aikawa and Midori Utsumi
- 2006 - Eiichiro Funakoshi and Kazuyo Matsui
- 2007 - Hiromi and Iyo Matsumoto
- 2008 - Nobuharu Asahara and Fumiko Okuno
- 2009 - Osamu Suzuki and Miyuki О̄shima
- 2010 - Kensuke Sasaki and Akira Hokuto / Katsuya Nomura and Sachiyo Nomura
- 2011 - George Takahashi and Mika Mifune
- 2012 - Kо̄ji Ohara and Hitomi Obara
- 2013 - Baku О̄wada and Kumiko Okae
- 2014 - Akira Nakao and Shino Ikenami / Hiroyuki Akimoto and Ai Ōtomo
- 2015 - Takashi Fujii and Otoha / Hiroshi Hase and Kyо̄ko Takami
- 2016 - Taiyo Sugiura and Nozomi Tsuji / Ryūdō Uzaki and Yōko Aki / (Special Award) Mihaela and Kan Aoyagi
- 2017 - Kiyoshi Nishikawa and Helen Nishikawa / Hideyuki Nakayama and Ayaka Shiraki
- 2018 - Takanori Jinnai and Eriko Jinnai / Tomoharu Shōji and Miki Shōji
- 2019 - Hideki Takahashi and Akiko Kobayashi / Takahiro Azuma and Megumi Yasu / Yoshikazu Takahashi and Momoshige Takahashi
- 2020 - Ryōhei Odai and LiLiCo / (Business Category) Atsushi О̄yama and Hiroko О̄yama (大山裕子) (Note: The English rendering of this name could not be confirmed at the time of translation.)
- 2021 - Tōru Watanabe and Ikue Sakakibara / (Business Category) Kenneth and Debbie Reilly
- 2022 - Hidekazu Akai and Yoshiko Akai / (Business Category) Ei Takeshita and Kimiyo Takeshita
- 2023 - Seiichi Tanabe and Nene Ōtsuka / (Business Category) Sōichirō Higuchi (樋口莊一郎) and Yasuko Higuchi (樋口泰子)

== Celebrities who registered marriages on Good Spouses Day ==
Good Spouses Day has become a popular day for submitting a marriage registration as it is believed doing so will result in a healthy and long-lasting relationship.

- Mika Horii (1996)
- Ritsuko Tanaka (1997)
- Tetsuya Komuro and Keiko (2002)
- Haruka Igawa (2006)
- Genki Sudo (2007)
- Ryūto Sakamoto (2009)
- Naoko Suzuki (2012)
- Yōko Tabe (2012)
- Jun Mizutani (2013)
- Riku Matsuda and Nanaka (2016)
- Tōru Seino and Mitsu Dan (2019)
- Natsu Andō (2019)
- Masayasu Wakabayashi (2019)
