= Walter Edmonds (artist) =

American artist (1938–2011)

- Born: April 21, 1938; Philadelphia, Pennsylvania, U.S.
- Died: June 12, 2011 (aged 72–73); Philadelphia, Pennsylvania, U.S.
- Known for: Muralist, printmaker

Walter Edmonds (April 21, 1938 – June 11, 2011) was an American artist best known for the 14 murals he painted with Richard J. Watson for the Church of the Advocate in Philadelphia, Pennsylvania, United States.

== Biography ==
Walter Edmonds was born in April 21, 1938, in West Philadelphia, Pennsylvania. Originally, trained as a Chef at Edward W. Bok Technical High School, he began his career in the restaurant industry. Realizing his passion for the visual arts as a young adult, he began to immerse himself into his love for painting. He attended Philadelphia College of Art, Fleisher Art Memorial, and the Pennsylvania Academy of the Fine Arts.

In the early 1970s, the Church of the Advocate, a center of activity for the civil rights movement in North Philadelphia, commissioned Edmonds and fellow parishioner Richard Watson to paint murals for the interior of the church. They were requested to portray a combination of Black history and themes from the bible. The two artists were active in the Church of the Advocate and they donated their time to create the murals. Fourteen murals were completed from 1973 through 1976. Titles include "Creation", "I Have a Dream", "The Lord smote the firstborn in the land of Egypt", and "God has chosen the weak to confound the strong".

Edmonds' work was included in the 2015 exhibition We Speak: Black Artists in Philadelphia, 1920s–1970s at the Woodmere Art Museum. His work is in the collection of the Pennsylvania Academy of the Fine Arts. His papers are in the Smithsonian Libraries and Archives.

In 1966, Edmonds was among a group of young Black artists and students chosen to exhibit at William Penn Memorial Museum in Harrisburg by the mayor’s Committee on Human Relations. Others included Moe Brooker, Barbara Bullock, Charles Pridgen, Percy Ricks, Ellen Powell Tiberino and Leroy Johnson.
