= St. Stephen and the Incarnation Episcopal Church =

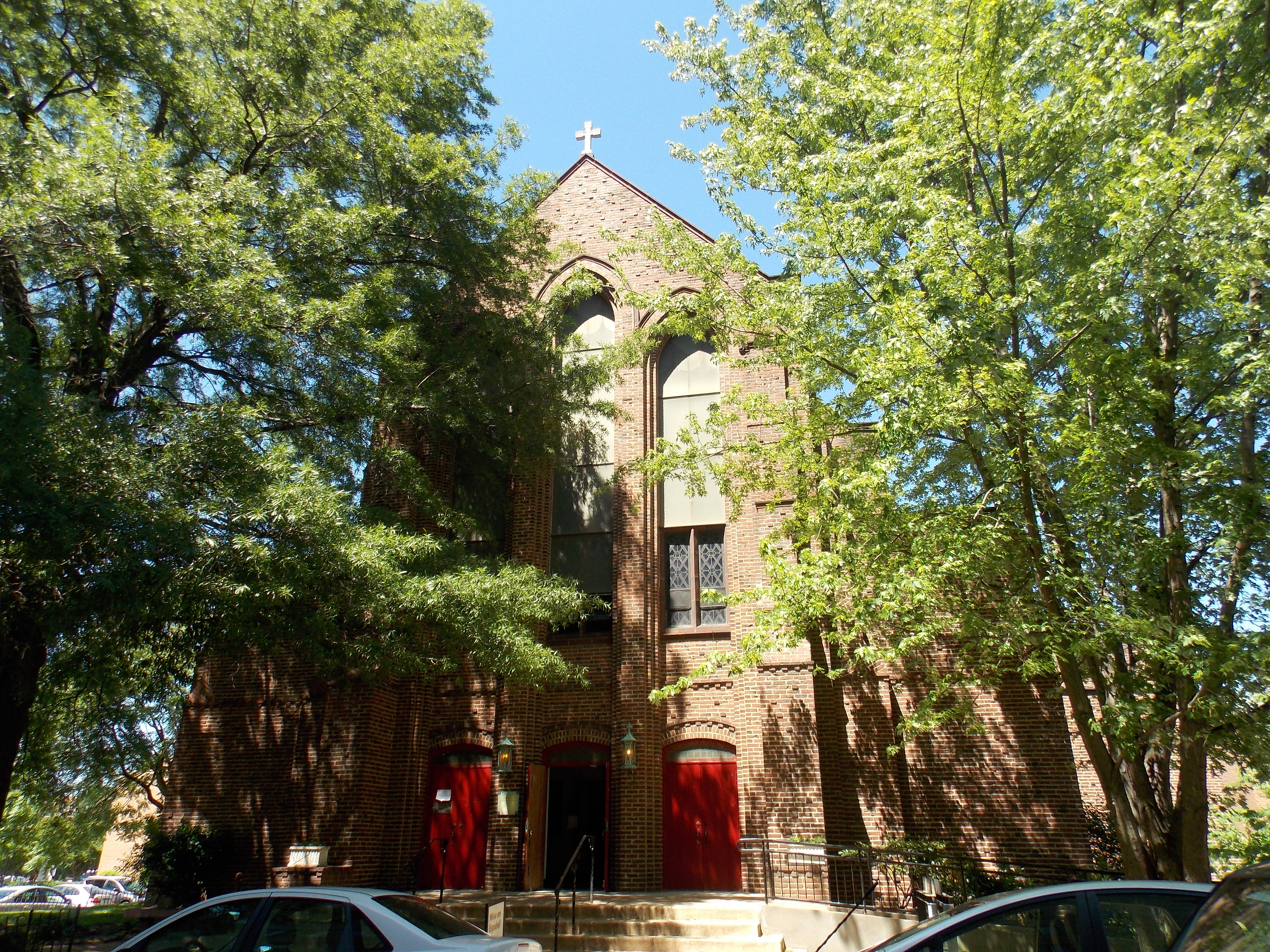

- Location within the District of Columbia Location within the United States
- 38°55′59.808″N 77°2′9.0558″W
- Location: Washington, DC
- Country: United States
- Denomination: Episcopal
- Website: www.saintstephensdc.org

Architecture
- Completed: December 25, 1929

Administration
- Diocese: Washington

St. Stephen and the Incarnation is an Episcopal parish in the Mount Pleasant neighborhood of Washington, D.C. It was formed by the merger of St. Stephen's parish and the Church of the Incarnation. It is notable as the site of the second ordination of female priests in the Episcopal Church and the first public celebration of the Eucharist in the Episcopal Church by a female celebrant.

The church has also played a role in climate change activism. As Bill McKibben noted in his book Oil and Honey, activists used the church as a staging ground for protests related to the Keystone XL Pipeline. The church has also been a punk rock venue.

The church reported 233 members in 2019 and 166 members in 2023; no membership statistics were reported in 2024 parochial reports. Plate and pledge income reported for the congregation in 2024 was $295,260. Average Sunday attendance (ASA) in 2024 was 91 persons.

== See also ==
- Positive Force
