= Church of the Advocate =

Historic church in Pennsylvania, United States

- George W. South Memorial Protestant Episcopal Church of the Advocate
- U.S. National Register of Historic Places
- U.S. National Historic Landmark
- Pennsylvania state historical marker
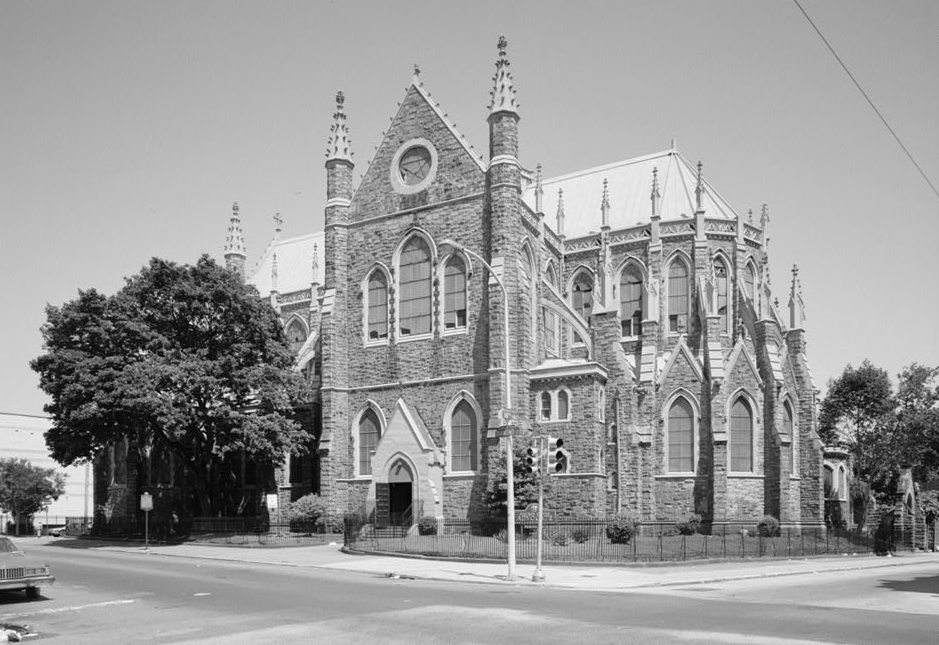

- Location within Philadelphia Location within Pennsylvania Location within the United States
- Location: 18th & Diamond Sts. Philadelphia, Pennsylvania
- Coordinates: 39°59′9″N 75°9′49″W
- Built: 1887
- Architect: Charles Marquedant Burns; Arthur H. Williams & Sons
- Architectural style: Gothic Revival
- NRHP reference No.: 80003620

Significant dates
- Added to NRHP: February 8, 1980
- Designated NHL: June 19, 1996
- Designated PHMC: July 29, 1999

Ordination to the priesthood of the Philadelphia Eleven

The George W. South Memorial Church of the Advocate, also known as the George W. South Memorial Protestant Episcopal Church, is a historic church at 18th and Diamond Street in North Philadelphia, Pennsylvania, USA.

The church reported 76 members in 2021 and 30 members in 2023; no membership statistics were reported in 2024 parochial reports. Plate and pledge income reported for the congregation in 2024 was $29,409. Average Sunday attendance (ASA) in 2024 was nine persons.

== History ==
The church was built from 1887 to 1897 as a memorial to the merchant and civil leader George Washington South (1799–1884). The church was designed by Charles Marquedant Burns (1838 – 1922), a prominent church architect in the late 19th and early 20th century. It was intended to serve as the Episcopal Cathedral of Philadelphia.

On July 29, 1974, the church was the site of the ordination of the Philadelphia Eleven, the first women priests in the Episcopal Church.

The church contains a series of 14 murals depicting vignettes of the Black experience in America, including slavery, emancipation, and scenes from the Civil Rights Movement. They were painted between 1973 and 1976 by Philadelphia artist Walter Edmonds and Richard J. Watson. The murals can be found primarily in the transepts and aisles of the church. Father Washington commissioned the murals in response to black parishioners who felt that the African-American experience was not validated in the church despite the fact that the majority of the community was African-American. Each of the fourteen murals was painted by either Edmonds or Watson, each of whom has a very different artistic style. Edmonds's pieces are mostly in fiery shades of orange and yellow and depict the violent oppression of blacks in America. Watson, on the other hand, used a cooler palette in his paintings to express sorrow in the black experience and the importance of memorializing this history as a way to find courage for the future.

The church was added to the National Register of Historic Places in 1980, and was designated a National Historic Landmark on June 19, 1996. The landmark designation cited the church as one of the finest examples of Gothic Revival architecture, with a complete set of stained glass windows provided by the English firm Clayton and Bell. It also cited the church's ongoing role in activism for African American civil rights.

== See also ==
- Barbara Clementine Harris
- Paul Washington
- List of National Historic Landmarks in Philadelphia
- National Register of Historic Places listings in North Philadelphia
