= William Pickens =

American orator, educator, and writer (1881–1954)

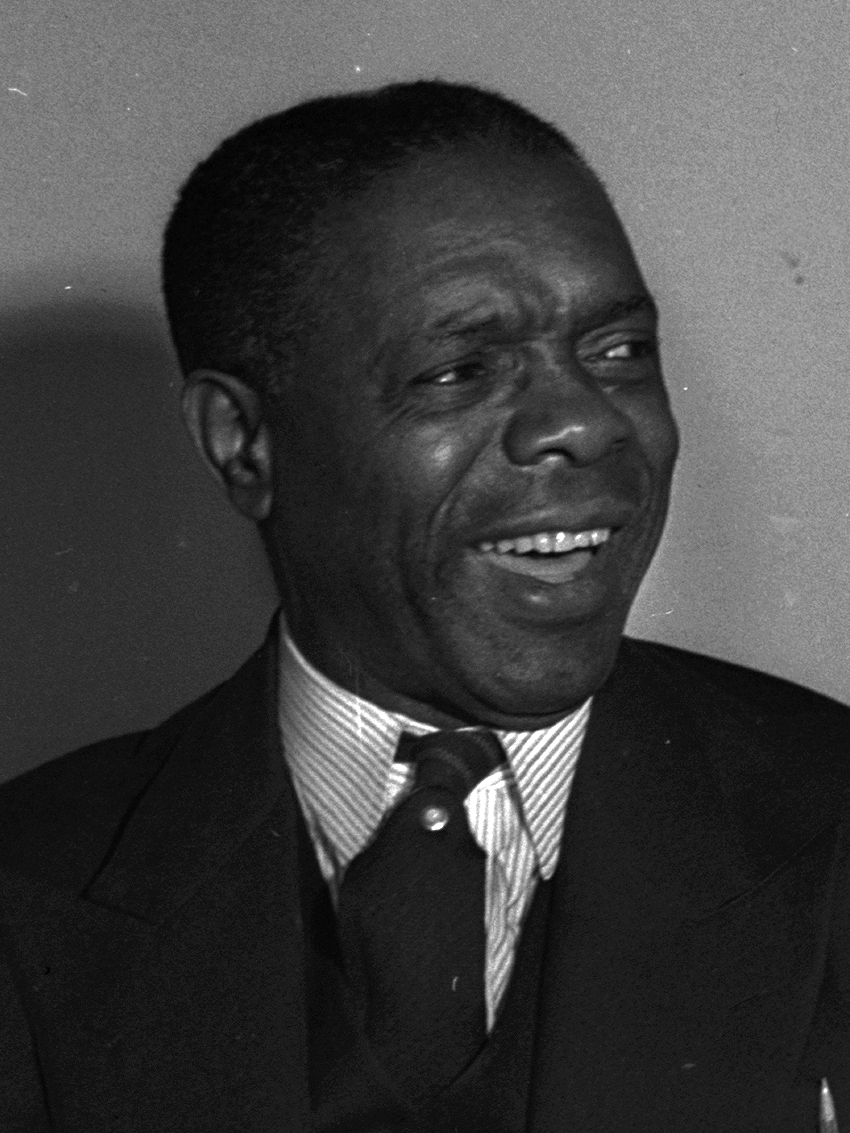
- Pickens in 1942
- Born: January 15, 1881; Anderson County, South Carolina, U.S.
- Died: April 6, 1954 (aged 73)
- Occupations: Orator, educator, journalist, essayist
- Children: Harriet Pickens

William Pickens (January 15, 1881 – April 6, 1954) was an American orator, educator, journalist, and essayist. He wrote multiple articles and speeches, and two autobiographies, The Heir of Slaves (1911) and Bursting Bonds (1923). In the latter book he noted race-motivated attacks on African Americans, both in the urban riots of 1919, which took place across the country, and in lynchings in 1921.

His works called for the liberty and emancipation of African Americans. He devoted much of his life traveling the world as a spokesperson for the freedom of African Americans, and worked to promote the beliefs of scholar W. E. B. Du Bois.

== Biography ==
Pickens, the son of freed slaves who became tenant farmers, was born on January 15, 1881, in Anderson County, South Carolina. His family moved when he was young and he was raised mostly in Arkansas. Before this move, he received a basic education. The entire first year in Arkansas, his parents kept him at home to help with field work to pay off their debt.

In the winter of 1890, Pickens and his family moved to Argenta, Arkansas (now known as North Little Rock, Arkansas.) His mother believed this town would have improved education and more opportunities for her children to succeed. Pickens was able to broaden his world, both because of a longer school term of nine months, and meeting more new people in the growing city. Before attending the school in Argenta, Pickens had taught himself to write.

He began his first term at his new school three months late, but soon developed a newfound appreciation for education and studying. Within three months Pickens became the leader of the class, holding the highest rank. He always made a one hundred for his daily average in mathematics.

At the end of his first school year, one of his teachers gave Pickens a gift to mark his punctuality and perfect attendance. It was a novel by Charles Beezly, entitled Our Manners and Social Customs. This was the first book Pickens read for pleasure, as it was not related to his school texts. At the start of Pickens' fourth year at the Argenta school, when he was 13 years old, his mother died. He believed that she died because of physical exploitation, ill treatment, and life-threatening health conditions. Pickens felt confusion and sorrow, but later wrote that he was reassured by God that his mother wanted him to succeed and would want him to continue his work even without her there to support him. He drew from this to build his confidence and faith in his abilities.

When Pickens began high school in Argenta, he soon became first in his class for algebra. Jealous of his success, Pickens's classmates ridiculed and teased him. He did not allow this to dissuade him from studying; their teasing only motivated him to put in more work and make a name for himself.

He studied at multiple schools, mostly in Argenta. He received bachelor's degrees from Talladega College (1902) and Yale University (1904), where he was inducted into Phi Beta Kappa. He was awarded the Henry James Ten Eyck Prize for an essay about Haiti.

He earned a master's degree from Fisk University (1908) and a Litt. D from Selma University in 1915. Both of these were historically black colleges or universities.

In 1911, he published his first autobiography, entitled The Heir of Slaves. He detailed his experiences as a Black man living in the late nineteenth and early twentieth century. In 1920, he joined the National Association for the Advancement of Colored People (NAACP). He was a member for more than two decades.

In 1923, he published a second autobiography, Bursting Bonds. This became his best-known published work.

Throughout his later life, Pickens traveled the world as a spokesman to "arouse colored people from the lethargy which hovered over them during the early decades of the 20th century." In his lectures to fellow Blacks, Pickens furthered the views of W. E. B. Dubois and advocated for the freedom of his race.

He married the former Minnie Cooper McAlpin(e). They had three children together: William Jr, Harriet, and Ruby Pickens. Harriet Pickens entered the US Navy as a WAVE and during World War II became one of the first two African-American women officers in the service.

Pickens was a Methodist. He died at sea on April 6, 1954, while vacationing with his wife on the RMS Mauretania. He was buried at sea.

== Published works ==
=== The Heir of Slaves (1911) ===
Writing to share his experiences and discuss the significance of education, The Heir of Slaves provides chronological coverage of major events in Pickens' life. He also writes about his family, his schooling and teachers who pushed him to succeed, and how he accomplished many things in his life and made a name for himself. For instance, he says that classmates teased him but he responded to their ridicule by studying harder and developed a love of learning. He is determined to become an accomplished Black man, and attests to the benefits of hard work and persistence.

=== "The Kind of Democracy the Negro Race Expects" (1918) ===
Pickens asserts in his 1918 article "The Kind of Democracy the Negro Race Expects" that the word ‘democracy’ means different things to different people. He says there are six ways to identify what democracy should mean. First is Democracy in Education, which allows equal training for both races, and makes a clear distinction of talent rather than skin color. Second is Democracy in Industry, which justifies a reasonable wealth distribution measured by output and efficiency. Third is Democracy in State—a political system where all are governed by identical rules and policies. Fourth is Democracy without Sex-preferment. This democracy states there is no difference between race or sex in the freedom of people. Fifth is Democracy in Church, which calls for equality within the religion. Lastly, Pickens states that one specific group or race should not have more access to public property or private liberties due to skin color.

== Career ==
=== Educational career ===
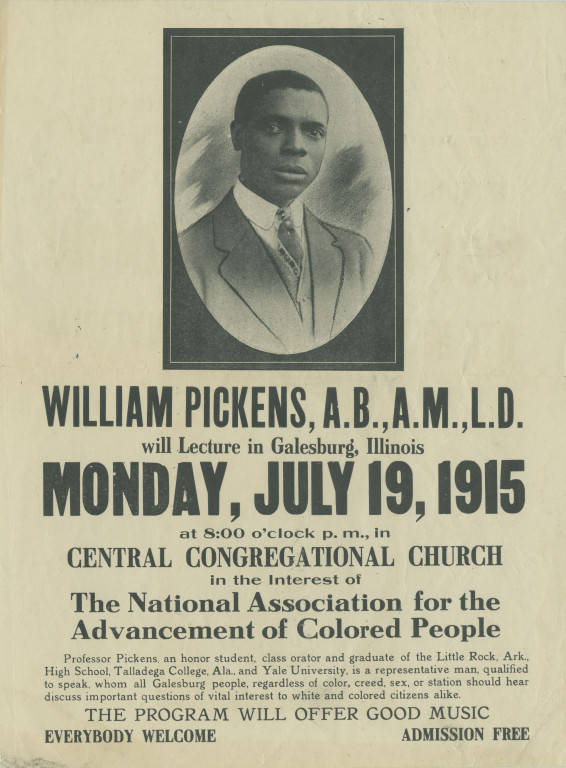
Handbill for a speaking event featuring Pickens, 1915

Pickens was fluent in and instructed several languages, including Latin, Greek, German, and Esperanto. He taught at his first alma mater, Talladega College, for 10 years. In 1915, he began teaching at Wiley College. He was also became a professor of sociology and a college dean at Morgan State College, a historically black college in Baltimore, Maryland.

=== NAACP ===
In 1920, Pickens was an active member of the National Association for the Advancement of Colored People (NAACP). He served as an advocate in this organization for twenty-two years. Pickens was initially considered for the position of field secretary but James Weldon Johnson was selected in December 1916.

On January 12, 1920, Pickens was offered the position of assistant field secretary by NAACP executive secretary, John R. Shillady. Pickens finished teaching for the academic year at Morgan State College, and accepted a position there at a $3,000 salary. He also served as a director of branches, 1920–1940.

On January 15, 1923, Pickens joined the "eight people group". They wrote and sent a "Garvey Must Go" letter to the U.S. Department of Justice, arguing against Marcus Garvey for what they considered mismanagement of his organization. Feeling later that Garvey's sentence was excessive and racially motivated, in August 1927 Pickens wrote a letter to The New Republic that called for Garvey's release from prison.

Pickens once said, "Color had been made the mark of enslavement and was taken to be also the mark of inferiority; for prejudice does not reason, or it would not be prejudice... If prejudice could reason, it would dispel itself."

As a prominent NAACP activist, Pickens travelled widely in and beyond the US. In 1927, for instance, he visited Europe. In Britain, he was hosted by Quakers. From Britain, he went to Germany, Poland, and the USSR. He stayed in the Soviet Union for two weeks and had a brief meeting with Leon Trotsky, who Pickens said "showed intelligent interest in the American Negro". In 1936, Pickens travelled to Hawai'i and Central America.

Despite tensions between the NAACP and the Communist Left, especially because of their competition in helping the defendants in the Scottsboro case, during the 1930s Pickens was affiliated with the political Left, as were many other intellectuals. He did not join the Communist Party, but supported numerous Socialist-led campaigns. In 1934, he endorsed Norman Thomas, presidential candidate of the American Socialist Party.

Pickens visited Spain in August 1938 during its Civil War. After returning to the U.S., he worked with the Spanish Aid Committee to raise funds for the Republican cause. While he played down his associations with the Left – notably during his interview with the anti-Communist House Un-American Activities Committee – he was associated with numerous organisations that were part of the Communists' "Popular Front", including the International Labor Defense, the American League Against War and Fascism, and the American Committee for the Protection of Foreign Born.

Pickens published writings in such pro-Communist journals as the New Masses and Fight. In his essay "The Fight Against Fascism", he joined a chorus of Black anti-fascists who argued that the beginnings of fascism had long been evident in the U.S. South.

=== U.S. Treasury ===
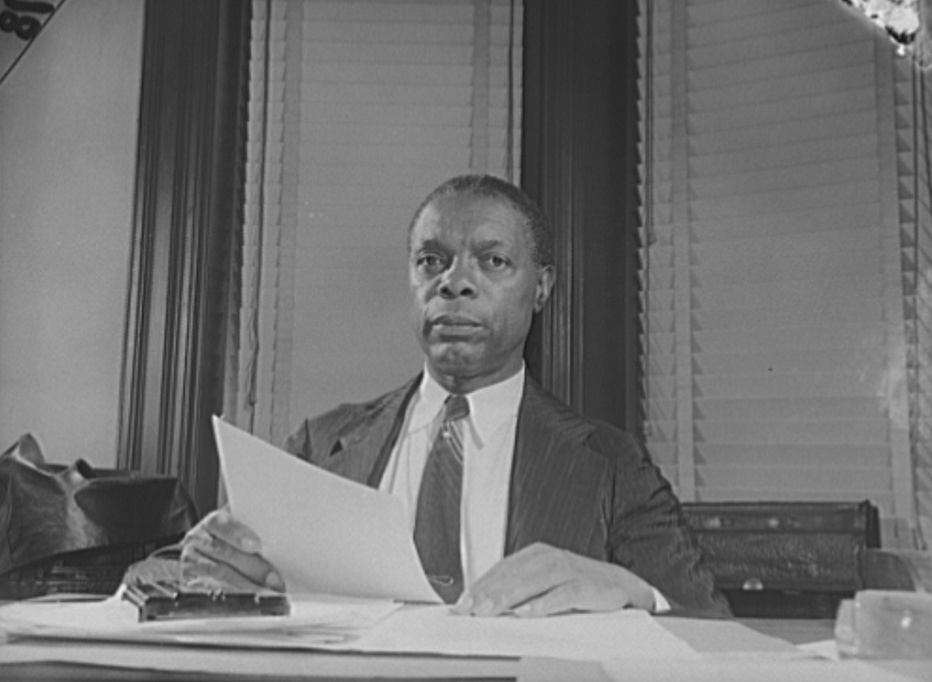
Pickens at his desk, 1942

From 1941-1950, Pickens served as the director of the interracial section of the Treasury Department's Saving Bonds Division, during the Franklin D. Roosevelt and Truman administrations. Beginning after the United States entry into World War II, he promoted individuals investing in WWII war bonds. In this role, he is said to have had more direct contact with the Negro masses than any other African-American leaders in his time. He also spoke to European-American and mixed audiences.

=== Other ===
His address "Misrule in Hayti" won him the Ten Eyck Prize for oratory. Ten years later, he renounced his ideas. The address led to a conflict between Pickens, Monroe Trotter, and Booker T. Washington.

Other published works by Pickens include the following: "Abraham Lincoln, Man and Statesman" (1909), "The Heir of Slaves" (1911), "Frederick Douglass and the Spirit of Freedom" (1912), "Fifty Years of Emancipation" (1913), The Ultimate Effects of Segregation and Discrimination" (1915), "The New Negro" (1916), "The Kind of Democracy the Negro Race Expects" (1918), "The Negro in the Light of the Great War" (1919), "The Vengeance of the Gods" (1922), and "American Aesop" (1926).

=== Subject to Anti-Communist actions ===
On February 1, 1943, Pickens was one of the 39 men, all federal government employees, named by Martin Dies as affiliates of "Communist front organizations", who urged Congress to refuse "to appropriate money for their salaries," accusing them of being disloyal to the U.S. Congress offered an amendment to the Treasury and Post Office Appropriations Bill, then in the House Appropriations Committee, to remove funding for the salary of these 39 government employees.

After legislators learned that Pickens was the only employee who would be covered by that appropriations bill, the initial amendment failed. Dies proposed a separate action to withhold only Pickens's salary.

A few days later, it became known that Pickens was the only Black person in the list of 39; the appearance of racism along with a public push to give the named men a "day in court" persuaded the committee to create a sub-committee (the Kerr Committee) to investigate the Dies allegations. Pickens wrote to and met with people investigating the allegations. The Kerr committee did not name Pickens as being subversive or unfit.

=== Recognition and legacy ===
In 1973, Yale University created the William Pickens Prize, named after Pickens for his contributions to the university. The award is given by the Department of African American Studies to the top senior essayist.

Pickens and his family began what became four generations of the Pickens family who have lived and summered in Sag Harbor Hills or SANS, a traditionally Black beach enclave in Sag Harbor's Eastville neighborhood. In the 1950s Pickens and his family were frequently visited by poet Langston Hughes, who was his Yale college roommate.

In 2004, Pickens's grandson, William Pickens III, permanently moved to the family home in Sag Harbor Hills from Queens. Pickens III is a patron of the Sag Harbor Bay Street Theatre.

== Bibliography ==
- Abraham Lincoln, Man and Statesman, 1909
- The Heir of Slaves, 1910/11
- Frederick Douglass and the Spirit of Freedom, 1912
- The Ultimate Effect of Segregation and Discrimination, 1915
- The New Negro: His Political, Civil and Mental Status, and Related Essays, 1916
- The Renaissance of the Negro Race
- The Negro in the Light of the Great War, 1918
- The Kind of Democracy the Negro Expects, 1919
- The Vengeance of the Gods and Three Other Stories of the Real American Color Line, 1922
- Bursting Bonds, Boston: Jordan & More Press, 1923
- American Aesop: Negro and Other Humor, 1926.
- "Aftermath of a Lynching" in Negro Anthology, 1934.
