= Maria Emiliana Aquino =

- Born: June 27, 1916; San Juan Pueblo (Ohkay Owingeh Pueblo), New Mexico
- Died: February 10, 2004 (aged 87); Santa Fe, New Mexico
- Burial place: Santa Fe National Cemetery
- Military career
- Navy Medical Service Corps: Navy WAVES; United States Navy
- Service years: 1943-1964
- Rank: Lieutenant Commander
- Known for: First native American woman officer in the U.S. Navy

Maria Emiliana Aquino was the first native American female officer in the U.S. Navy.

== Early life ==
Aquino was born 27 June 1916 in San Juan Pueblo (Ohkay Owingeh Pueblo), New Mexico to Delfido and Juanita Aquino. Her father was the two term governor of San Juan Pueblo. She went to high school at Santa Fe Indian School and college at the University of New Mexico graduating with a bachelor's degree in art. She then went to Philadelphia to study nursing and occupational therapy. She was working at a tuberculosis recovery center in Rapid City, South Dakota when Pearl Harbor was attacked.

== Military career ==
On 10 January 1943, Aquino joined the WAVES (Women Accepted for Volunteer Emergency Service) and despite her college degree and certifications she was sent to the Hospital Corps Rehabilitation School at Hunter College in New York for training as an occupational therapy assistant. By 1944, she was a Pharmacist's Mate Second Class in the WAVES.

On 26 September 1944, Aquino was commissioned as an ensign in the WAVES at the Naval Hospital at Bethesda, Maryland and was promoted to lieutenant, junior grade in 1946. On 12 July 1948 she was sworn into the U.S. Navy as an active duty officer and an occupational therapist in the Medical Service Corps after President Truman signed the Women's Armed Services Integration Act.

She was promoted to full lieutenant in July 1949 and lieutenant commander in 1957. Aquino would serve during the Korean War and she would retire from the Navy in 1964.

== Death ==
Maria Aquino died on 10 February 2004 and is buried in Santa Fe National Cemetery.
