= Mary Virginia Harris =

- Born: Mary Virginia Harris; 1911
- Died: 2004 (aged 92–93)
- Education: University of Chicago
- Known for: WAVES, Penn Museum excavations at Hasanlu Tepe

Mary Virginia Harris (1911-2004) was an American veteran of World War II who served in the Women Accepted for Volunteer Emergency Service (WAVES), which the U.S. Navy created as a program for women following the attack on Pearl Harbor. Harris wrote the manual for WAVES, called Guide Right (1944). Later in her career, she managed materials and records from the University of Pennsylvania’s excavations at the archaeological site of Hasanlu Tepe, in Iran.

== Career ==
After graduating with a master's degree from the University of Chicago in 1937, Harris became dean of the Maryland College for Women and Pine Manor Junior College in Chestnut Hill, Massachusetts. In 1942, Harris became one of the first American women to volunteer for active duty in the U.S. Navy, as a member of the United States Naval Reserve (Women’s Reserve), more commonly known as WAVES (Women Accepted for Volunteer Emergency Service). Harris wrote the training manual for WAVES, entitled, Guide Right, in 1944, and remained on active reserve until 1965. She later became a volunteer archivist at the Penn Museum involved in the Hasanlu expeditions to Iran.

== Military service ==
Mary Virginia Harris was among the first women to commission in the WAVES in 1942. At the rank of Lieutenant (junior grade), she was stationed at the Naval Reserve Midshipmen's School at Smith College in Northampton, Massachusetts, where the Navy trained new WAVES officers, who learned, for example, how to recognize enemy aircraft and organize the crew on ships. During her service, she authored Guide Right: A Handbook for WAVES and SPARs, which detailed military etiquette, naval terms, and personal conduct for female reservists in the Navy and Coast Guard during World War II. A video commemorating her life made by the Penn Museum notes that “as a member of the Events committee of the United Nations Council, Lt. Commander Mary Virginia Harris, U.S.N.R. helped plan the atomic bomb discussion Thursday night at the Bellevue Stratford.” Though the United Nations was not founded until after the war, this reference may have been to a 1943 precursor conference recorded by the Historical Society of Pennsylvania. Harris remained in the Naval Reserve after the war, retiring at the rank of Lieutenant Commander in 1965.

== Volunteer work ==
Mary Virginia Harris's background in education and her extensive travels led her to a post-war career as a volunteer at the Penn Museum, where she worked from 1962 to 1997. At the Penn Museum, she served as an honorary member of the Women's Committee, helped to establish the museum’s Volunteer Guide program, and acted as registrar and later archivist of the University of Pennsylvania’s excavations at Iron Age Hasanlu, Iran, directed by archaeologist Robert H. Dyson, Jr. As an avid gardener who lectured for the Pennsylvania Horticultural Society, she published an analysis of the botanical landscape of Hasanlu, with particular attention to its wildflowers.
