= Frances Wills =

American naval officer (1910–1998)

Frances Eliza Wills
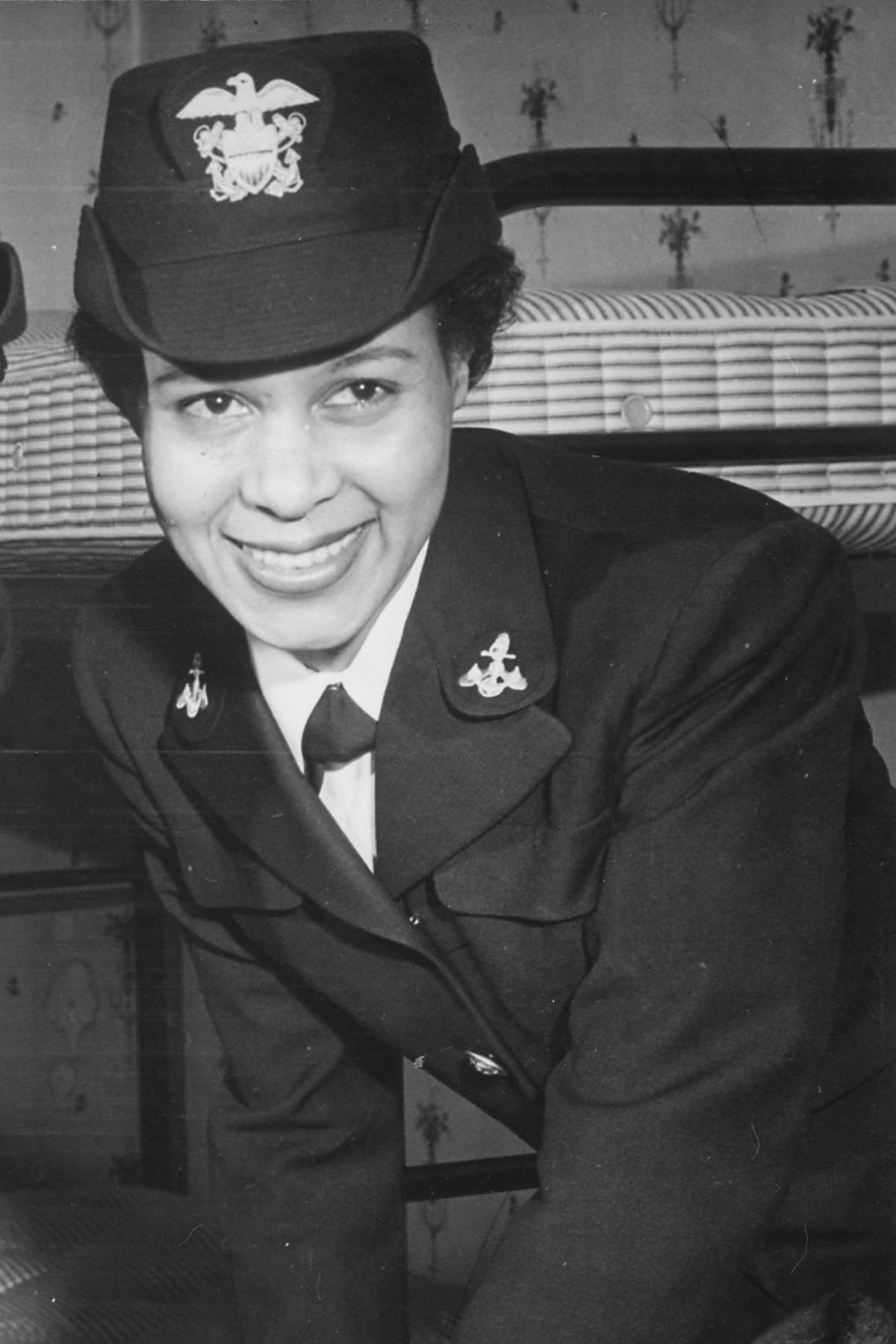
- Born: 12 July 1910; Philadelphia, U.S.
- Died: 18 January 1998 (aged 87); New York, U.S.
- Other name: Frances E. Thorpe
- Education: Hunter College, University of Pittsburgh
- Occupations: Naval officer, secretary
- Employer: United States Navy
- Known for: Being one of the first two African American women officers in the US Navy.
- Notable work: Navy Blue and Other Colors: A Memoir of Adventure and Happiness
- Spouse: Charles L. Thorpe

Frances Eliza Wills (married name: Frances Thorpe; 12 July 1910 – 18 January 1998) was an American naval officer and one of the first two African American female officers commissioned by the United States Navy. After her years with the WAVES, she worked as a secretary to Langston Hughes.

== Early life ==
Frances Eliza Wills was born in Philadelphia. She attended Hunter College in New York City, and subsequently earned a master's degree in social work from the University of Pittsburgh. While there, she met the poet and activist Langston Hughes. Wills worked for some years at the YMCA, organizing community events and social aid. She was working in New York as a social worker when approached to enlist with the WAVES.

== WAVES ==
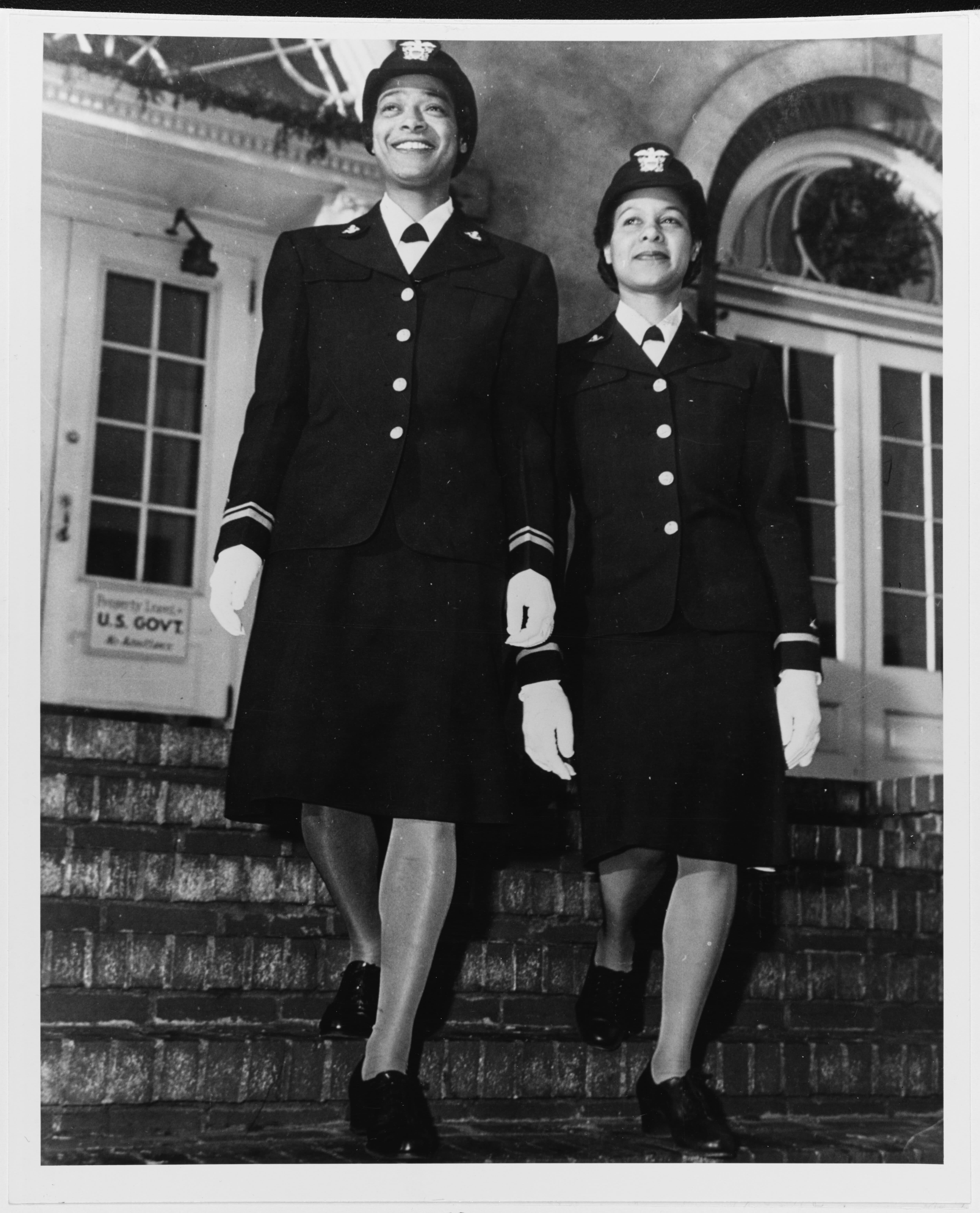
Harriet Ida Pickens and Frances Wills (right), 1944

The Women's Reserve force of the US Navy, known as the WAVES (Women Accepted for Volunteer Emergency Service), was established on 30 July 1942. Though many African American women sought to enlist, then Secretary of the US Navy Frank Knox refused their admission. Following Knox's sudden death in April 1944, existing pressure from activists was increased, and on October 19, President Franklin D. Roosevelt authorized their inclusion in the WAVES - which was to be fully integrated. Frances Wills and Harriet Pickens were chosen as the first African American female recruits. They were enlisted in the WAVES on November 13, 1944.

In her memoir, Wills would recall:

In October 1944 when the Navy said it was ready for me and I said, ‘Take me,’ I was not consciously making a statement about race relations.

Both women were sent to the WAVES training facility in New York City, where Wills became a classification test administrator for the enlisted. By the end of the war, over 70 more African American women had joined the ranks of the WAVES.

== Later life ==
Wills was discharged from the Navy at the end of the war. She later authored a book on her experiences called Navy Blue and Other Colors: a memoir of adventure and happiness. This was published under her married name, Francis Wills Thorpe. Her husband was Charles L. Thorpe. Wills also became President of the Brooklyn Botanical Garden Auxiliary, in Palm Coast, Florida.

Frances Wills Thorpe died on 18 January 1998. A memorial service was held for her in Sag Harbor, New York.
