= Gertrude Joy Grimm =

American businesswoman (1904–1988)

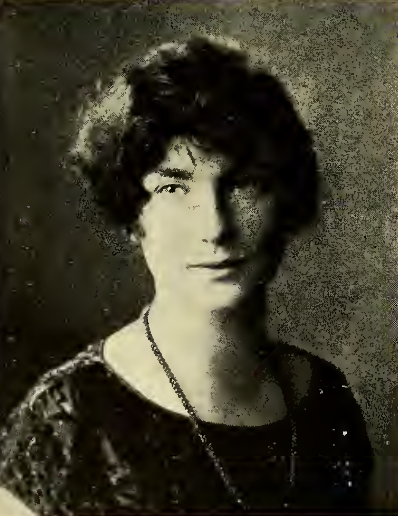
- Gertrude Joy Grimm from the 1926 yearbook of Wellesley College
- Born: Gertrude Joy; August 16, 1904; Plainfield, New Jersey, United States
- Died: June 2, 1988 (aged 83); Sarasota, Florida, United States
- Other names: Gertrude Joy Laurence, Gertrude Joy Ferris

Gertrude Joy Ferris Grimm (August 16, 1904 – June 2, 1988) was an American businesswoman. During World War II, she was assistant to Mildred McAfee, commander of the WAVES, the women's branch of the United States Navy Reserve.

== Early life ==
Gertrude Joy was born in Plainfield, New Jersey, the youngest daughter of James Richard Joy and Emma Prentice McGee Joy. Her father was the editor of the New York Methodist Christian Advocate, a church publication, and her mother a clubwoman. Her older sister Helen went overseas for YWCA work during World War I. She graduated from Wellesley College in 1926.

== Career ==
Joy worked in retail and advertising, at W. & J. Sloane in New York, and at J. L. Hudson in Detroit. "Department store work gives one experience in working with people as no other experience can," she explained in 1942. During World War II, she worked in the personnel office of the War Department in Washington, D.C., then was commissioned by the Navy to work as assistant to WAVES commander Mildred McAfee. She helped to formulate housing standards for the women's reserve program, and established statistical records of the program's personnel. In 1946, she was decorated with a Navy Commendation ribbon by the Secretary of the Navy, for "outstanding performance of duty as a special assistant to the director of the Women's Reserve."

== Personal life ==
Gertrude Joy married three times. Her first husband was Irving M. Ferris. They married in 1929 and he died in 1935. Her second husband was banker Richard Lee Laurence; they married in 1936 in Michigan, and divorced in 1939. Her third husband was Peter Grimm; they married in 1942, in Washington, D.C. She had a son, Peter. Her third husband died in 1978, and she died from cancer in 1988, at the age of 83, in Sarasota, Florida.

Grimm's niece Joy Rushmore Hilliard was a conservationist based in Colorado. Her nephew Richard E. Mooney was a noted journalist and newspaper editor.
