= Harriet Pickens =

American naval officer and administrator

Harriet Ida Pickens
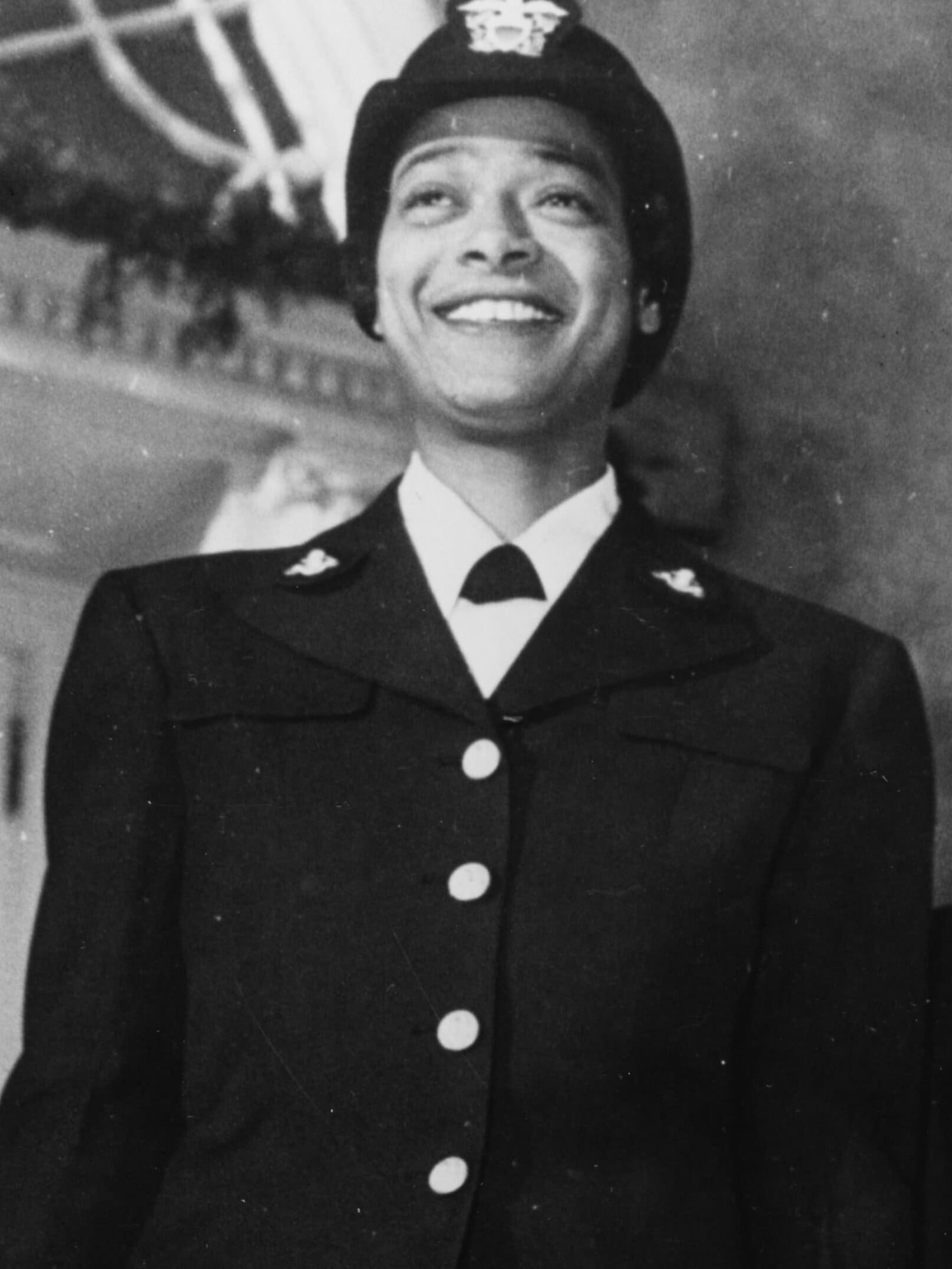
- Born: 17 March 1909; Talladega, Alabama, U.S.
- Died: 1969 (aged 59–60); New York City, New York State, U.S.
- Education: Smith College; Columbia University, Bennett College
- Occupations: Naval officer and administrator
- Organization: United States Navy
- Known for: Being one of the first African American women commissioned by the US Navy
- Father: William Pickens

Harriet Pickens (17 March 1909 – 1969) was an American naval officer and administrator. With Frances Wills, she was one of the first two African American women commissioned by the United States Navy, and the first to achieve the rank of lieutenant.

== Early life ==
Harriet Ida Pickens was born on 17 March 1909 in Talladega, Alabama, the daughter of educator and civil rights leader William Pickens. Pickens earned an undergraduate degree from Smith College, and later studied at Columbia University and Bennett College for Women.

At the time of her enlistment in the Navy, Pickens was working as an executive secretary at the Harlem Tuberculosis and Health Committee.

== WAVES ==
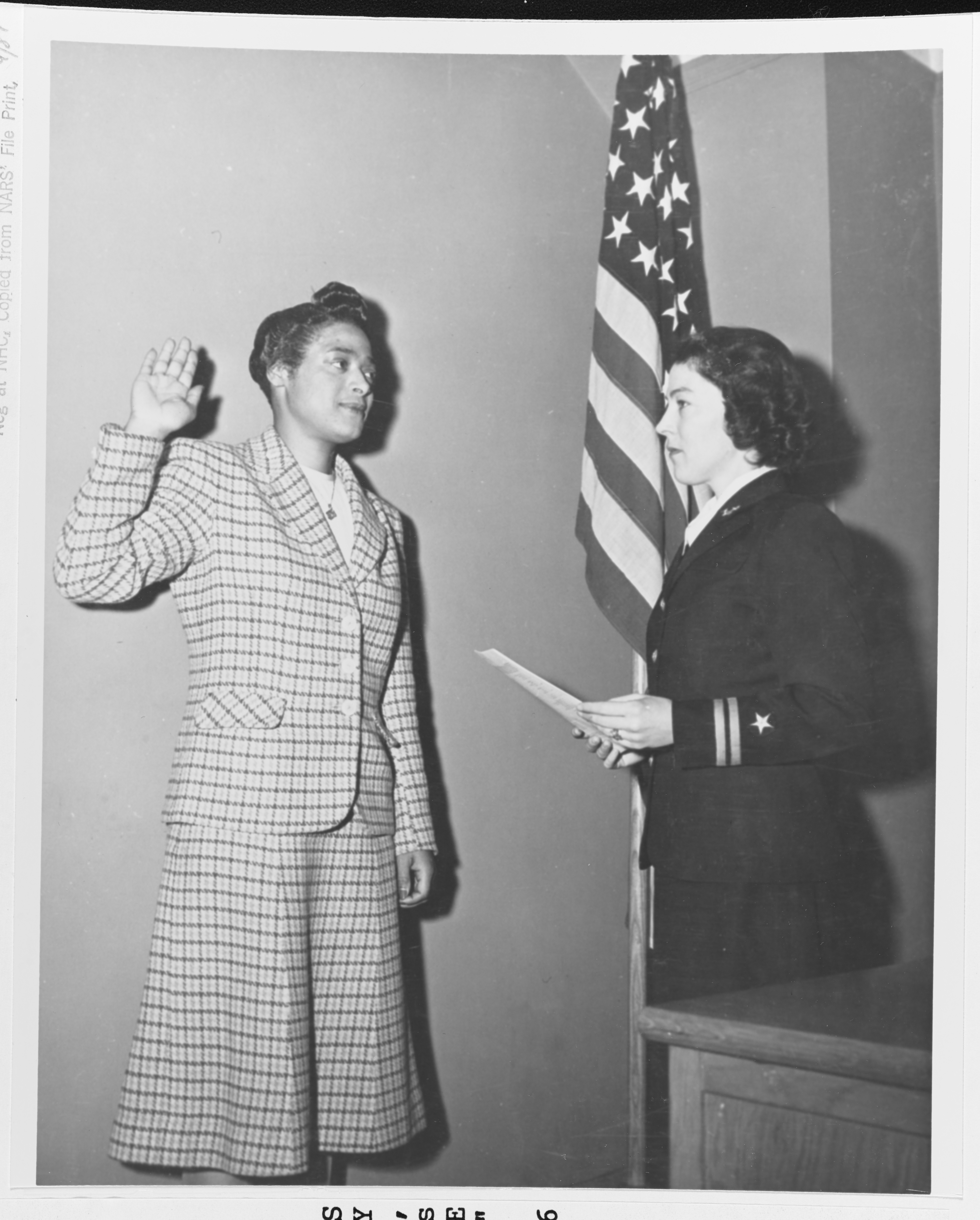
Harriet Ida Pickens being sworn in as an Apprentice Seaman by Lieutenant Rosamond D. Selle, USNR, in New York City, 1944.

The Women's Reserve force of the US Navy, known as the WAVES (Women Accepted for Volunteer Emergency Service), was established on 30 July 1942. WAVES women were restricted to service with the US, but African American women were excluded. Though many tried to enlist, then Secretary of the US Navy Frank Knox refused their admission. From early 1944, thanks to the efforts of activists and advocates including the NAACP, African American men were able to enlist in the officer corps, but African American women remained excluded. Following Knox's sudden death in April 1944, the pressure was increased, and on October 19, President Franklin D. Roosevelt authorized their inclusion in the WAVES - which was to be fully integrated. Harriet Pickens, along with social worker Frances Wills, were chosen as the first African American female recruits.

Pickens and Wills were enlisted in the WAVES on November 13, 1944, and, having completed their training, became officers 26 December that year. Both were sent to the WAVES training facility at Hunter College in the Bronx, New York City, where Pickens was assigned to the physical training program. Commissioned as a lieutenant, Pickens was the first African American woman to achieve this rank. She also worked as director of the Navy Material Redistribution and Disposal Administration in New York. They remained with the WAVES until the war's end.

== After the Navy ==
After the war, Harriet Pickens returned to work as a public health administrator for the Harlem Tuberculosis Office and the New York City Commission on Human Rights. She suffered a stroke and died in New York in 1969.
