= WAVES =

WWII Women's Navy Branch

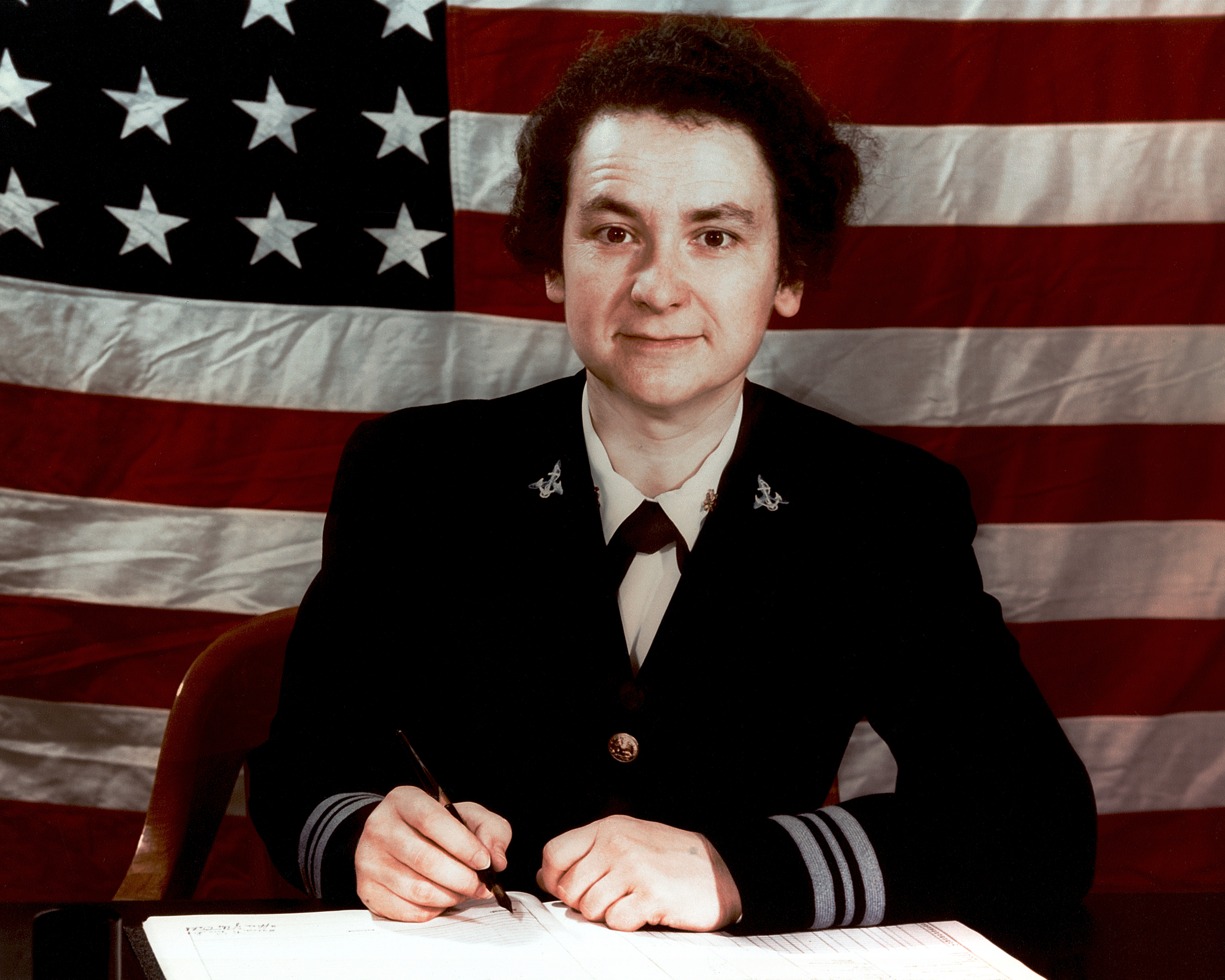
Captain Mildred H. McAfee was the first director of the WAVES (1942–1945). The photo was taken in 1942 or 1943, when she was ranked lieutenant commander.

United States Naval Reserve (Women's Reserve), better known as the WAVES (for Women Accepted for Volunteer Emergency Service), was the women's branch of the United States Naval Reserve during World War II. It was established on July 21, 1942, by the U.S. Congress and signed into law by President Franklin D. Roosevelt on July 30. This authorized the U.S. Navy to accept women into the Naval Reserve as commissioned officers and at the enlisted level, effective for the duration of the war plus six months. The purpose of the law was to release officers and men for sea duty and replace them with women in shore establishments. Mildred H. McAfee, on leave as president of Wellesley College, became the first director of the WAVES. She was commissioned a lieutenant commander on August 3, 1942, and later promoted to commander and then to captain.

The notion of women serving in the Navy was not widely supported in the Congress or by the Navy, even though some of the lawmakers and naval personnel did support the need for uniformed women during World War II. Public Law 689, allowing women to serve in the Navy, was due in large measure to the efforts of the Navy's Women's Advisory Council, Margaret Chung, and Eleanor Roosevelt, the first lady of the United States.

To be eligible for officer candidate school, women had to be aged 20 to 49 and possess a college degree or have two years of college and two years of equivalent professional or business experience. Volunteers at the enlisted level had to be aged 20 to 35 and possess a high school or a business diploma, or have equivalent experience. The WAVES were primarily white, but 72 African-American women eventually served. The Navy's training of most WAVES officer candidates took place at Smith College, Northampton, Massachusetts. Specialized training for officers was conducted on several college campuses and naval facilities. Most enlisted members received recruit training at Hunter College, in the Bronx, New York City. After recruit training, some women attended specialized training courses on college campuses and at naval facilities.

The WAVES served at 900 stations in the United States. The territory of Hawaii was the only overseas station where their staff was assigned. Many female officers entered fields previously held by men, such as medicine and engineering. Enlisted women served in jobs from clerical to parachute riggers. Many women experienced workplace hostility from their male counterparts. The Navy's lack of clear-cut policies, early on, was the source of many of the difficulties. The WAVES' peak strength was 86,291 members. Upon demobilization of the officer and enlisted members, Secretary of the Navy James Forrestal, Fleet Admiral Ernest King, and Fleet Admiral Chester Nimitz all commended the WAVES for their contributions to the war effort.

== Background ==
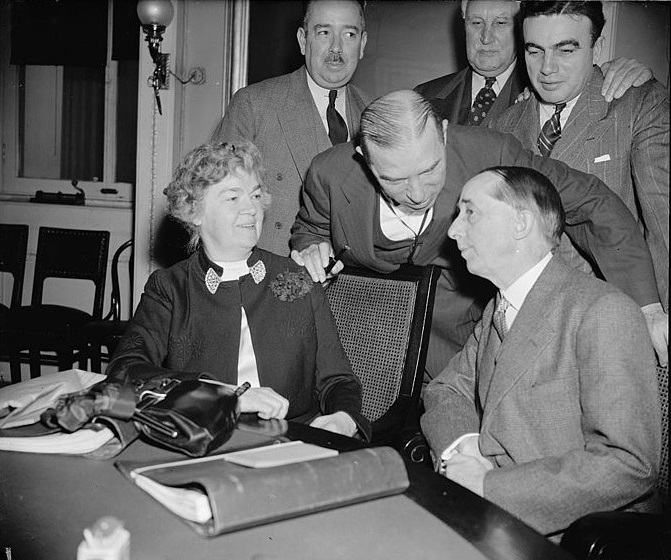
Representative Edith Nourse Rogers, of Massachusetts, is pictured in 1939 with other representatives.

In May 1941, Representative Edith Nourse Rogers of Massachusetts introduced a bill in the U.S. Congress to establish a Women's Army Auxiliary Corps (WAAC). As auxiliaries, women would serve with the Army rather than in it, and they would be denied the benefits of their male counterparts. Opposition delayed the passage of the bill until May 1942. (Note: In May 1942, the U.S. Congress authorized the Women's Army Auxiliary Corps (WAAC), but chose not to install it as a branch of the U.S. Army. Instead, it created it as an auxiliary unit, where the members were with the Army, but not in it. Consequently, the WAAC members did not have full military status and were denied such benefits as pensions, disability protection, and other rights granted to the male members of the Army. In July 1943, the Congress refashioned the WAAC into the Women's Army Corps (WAC), providing its members with the same benefits and rights as the male members of the U.S. Army.) At the same time, the U.S. Navy's Bureau of Aeronautics felt the Navy would eventually need women in uniform and had asked the Bureau of Naval Personnel, headed by Rear Admiral Chester W. Nimitz, to propose legislation as it had done during World War I, authorizing women to serve in the Navy under the Yeoman (F) classification. Nimitz was not considered an advocate for bringing women into the Navy, and the head of the U.S. Naval Reserve expressed the view that the Civil Service would be able to supply any extra personnel that might be needed.

On December 9, 1941, Representative Rogers telephoned Nimitz and asked him whether the Navy was interested in some sort of women's auxiliary corps. In her book Lady in the Navy, Joy Bright Hancock quotes his reply: "I advised Mrs. Rogers that at the present time I saw no great need for such a bill". Nevertheless, within days Nimitz was in touch with all Navy Department bureaus asking them to assess their needs for an equivalent to the WAAC. With few exceptions, the responses were negative, but Congressional inquiries about the Navy's plan for women continued to increase.

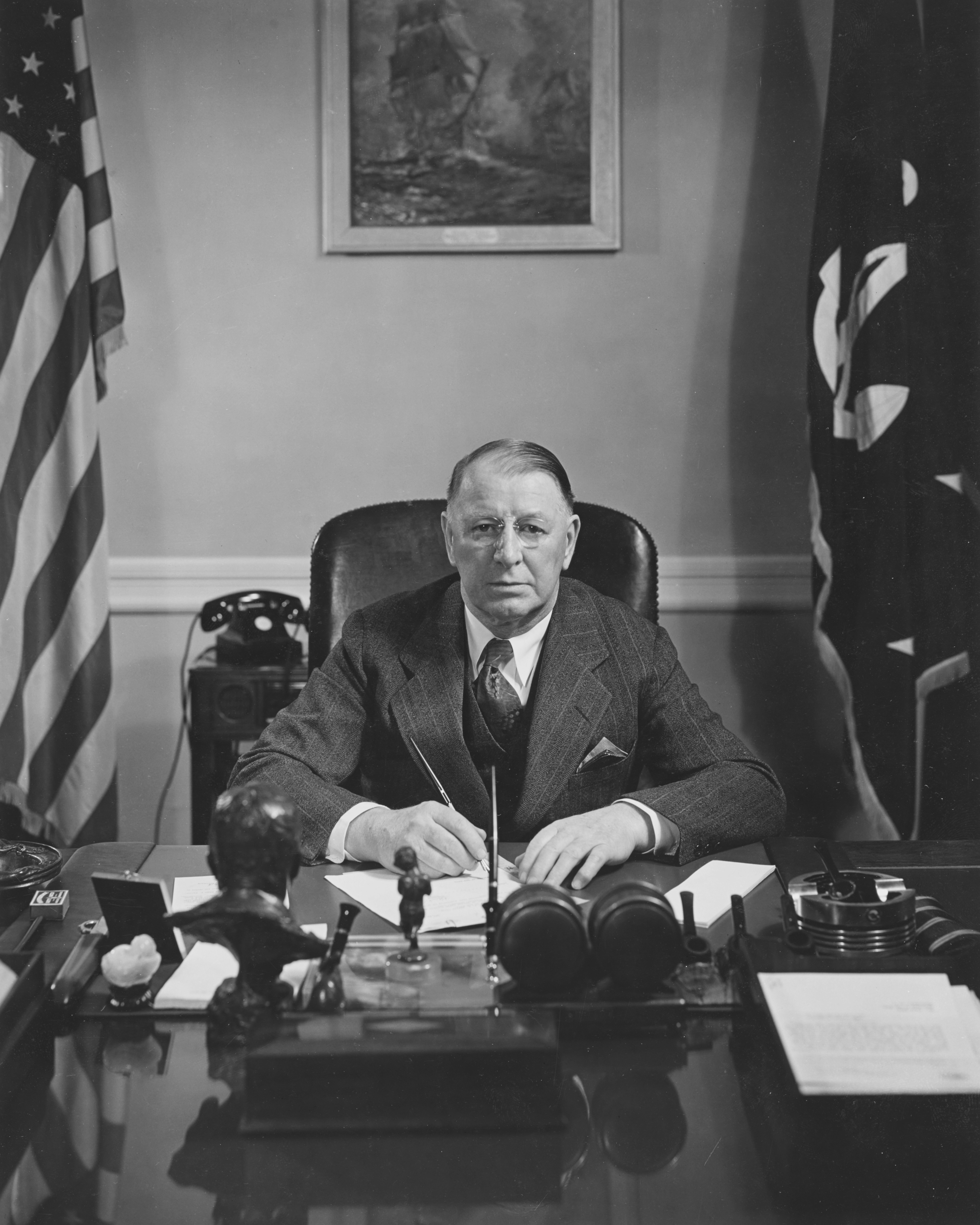
Frank Knox, Secretary of the Navy in 1940

On January 2, 1942, the Bureau of Naval Personnel, in an about-face, recommended to Secretary of the Navy Frank Knox that Congress be asked to authorize a women's organization. The following month, Knox recommended a women's branch as part of the Naval Reserve. The director of the Bureau of the Budget opposed his idea, but would agree to legislation similar to the WAAC bill – where women were with, but not in, the Navy. This was unacceptable to Knox. The Bureau of Aeronautics continued to believe there was a place for women in the Navy, and appealed to an influential friend of naval aviation named Margaret Chung. A San Francisco physician and surgeon, Chung was known to have had an interest in naval aviation. Many of her naval friends referred to themselves as sons of Mom Chung. In Crossed Currents, the authors describe how Chung used her influence:

Having learned of the stalemate, she asked one of these [sons], Representative Melvin Maas of Minnesota, who had served in the aviation branch of the U.S. Marine Corps in World War I, to introduce legislation independently of the Navy. On 18 March 1942 he did just that.

The Maas House bill was identical to the Knox proposal, which would make a women's branch part of the Naval Reserve. At the same time, Senator Raymond E. Willis of Indiana introduced a similar bill in the Senate. On April 16, 1942, the House Naval Affairs Committee reported favorably on the Maas bill. It was passed by the House the same day and sent to the Senate. The Senate Naval Affairs Committee was opposed to the bill, especially its chairman – Senator David I. Walsh of Massachusetts. He did not want women in the Navy because it "would tend to break-up American homes and would be a step backwards in the progress of civilization". The Senate committee eventually proposed a naval version of the WAAC, and President Franklin D. Roosevelt approved it, but Knox asked the president to reconsider.

== Creation of the program ==
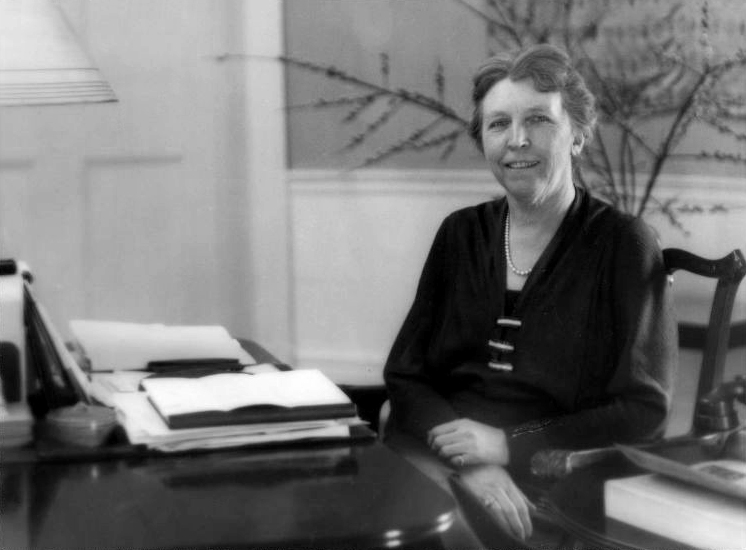
Ada Comstock, President of Radcliffe College (1923–1943), a member of the Women's Advisory Council

By mid-1942, it was apparent to the Navy that women would eventually be allowed to serve. The quandary for the organization was how to administer a women's program while fashioning it to their own liking. The Navy asked women educators for assistance, first contacting Virginia C. Gildersleeve, dean of Barnard College. She suggested that Barnard professor Elizabeth Reynard become a special assistant to Rear Admiral Randall Jacobs, Chief of Naval Personnel. Reynard was well known for her academic work on women in the workplace. She quickly formed the Women's Advisory Council to meet with Navy officials. Gildersleeve became the chairperson, and because of her efforts several prominent women agreed to serve on the council. They included:

- Meta Glass, president of Sweet Briar College
- Lillian Gilbreth, a specialist on efficiency in the workplace
- Ada Comstock, president of Radcliffe College
- Alice Crocker Lloyd, dean of women at the University of Michigan
- Gladys Graham, a lecturer from the West Coast
- Marie Rogers Gates, the wife of Thomas Sovereign Gates, president of the University of Pennsylvania
- Harriet Elliott, dean of women at the University of North Carolina
- Alice Baldwin, dean of women at Duke University, who served after Elliott's resignation.

The council knew the success of the program would depend on the woman chosen to lead it. A prospective candidate would need to possess proven managerial skills, command respect, and have an ability to get along with others. Their recommendation was Mildred H. McAfee, president of Wellesley College, as the future director. The Navy agreed. McAfee was an experienced and respected academician, whose background would provide a measure of credibility to the idea of women serving in the Navy. The task of convincing McAfee to accept and persuading the Wellesley Board of Trustees to release her was difficult, but eventually she was freed.

Reynard, who was later commissioned a lieutenant in the WAVES and rose to commander, was tasked with selecting a name:

I realized there were two letters that had to be in it: W for women and V for volunteer, because the Navy wants to make it clear that this is a voluntary service and not a drafted service. So, I played with those two letters and the idea of the sea and finally came up with Women Accepted for Volunteer Emergency Service – WAVES. I figured the word Emergency would comfort the older admirals because it implies that we're only a temporary crisis and won't be around for keeps.

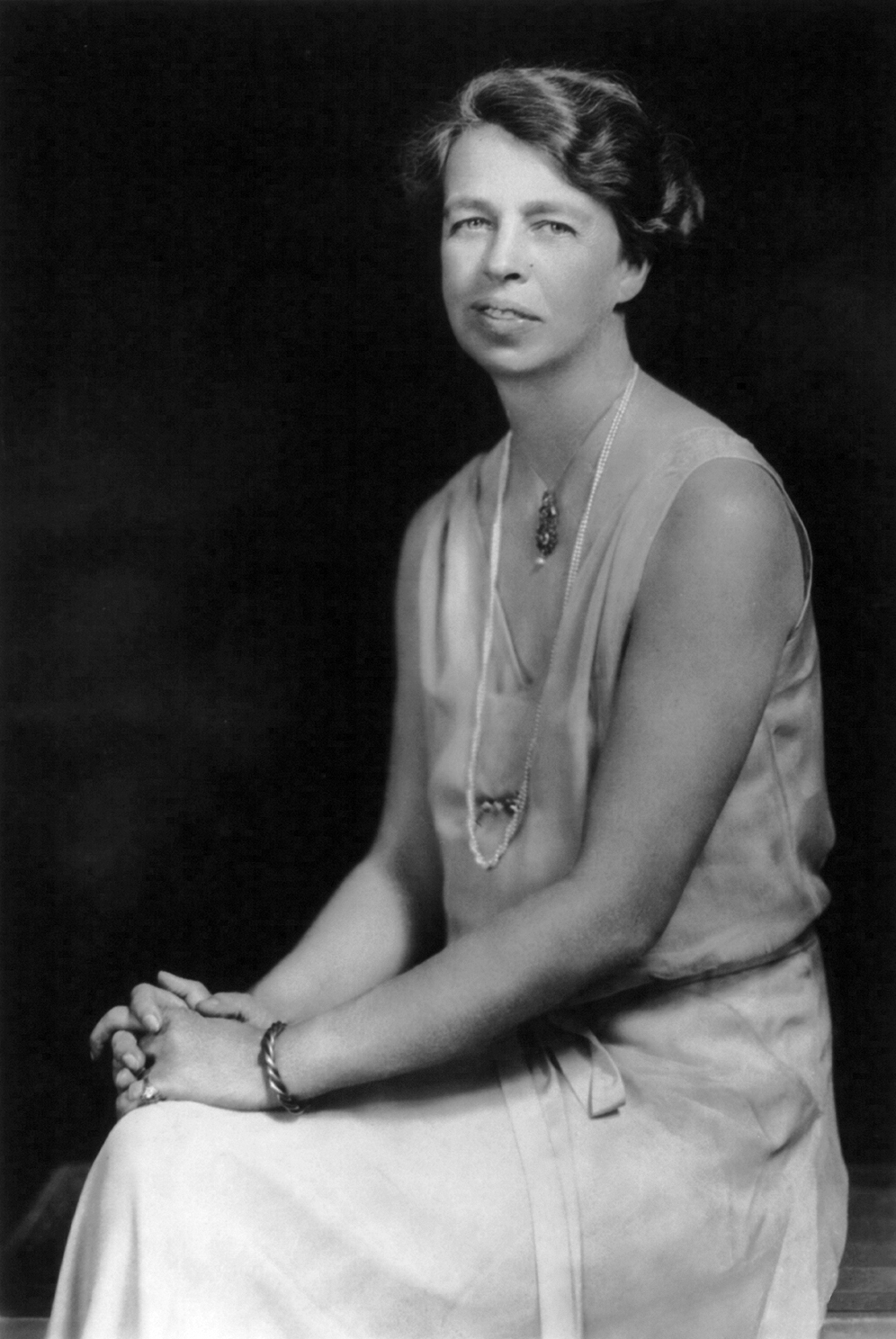
Eleanor Roosevelt, wife of President Franklin D. Roosevelt (1932)

On May 25, 1942, the Senate Naval Affairs Committee recommended to the president that the legislation to create a women's reserve for the U.S. Navy should parallel that of the original WAAC legislation, which decreed that women would serve with the Army rather than in it. The president called on Knox to reconsider his position, but Knox stood his ground. Advisory Council members Gildersleeve and Elliott each took it on themselves to write to the First Lady, Eleanor Roosevelt, explaining their objections to the WAAC legislation. Roosevelt showed Elliott's letter to her husband, the president, and she sent Gildersleeve's letter on to the Undersecretary of the Navy, James V. Forrestal, a former naval aviator. Within days Forrestal replied, saying that Secretary Knox had asked the president to reconsider. On June 16, Knox informed Rear Admiral Jacobs that the president had given him authority to proceed with a women's reserve.

Days later, Knox informed Senator Walsh of the president's decision, and on June 24 the Senate Naval Affairs Committee reported favorably on the bill. By July 21, the bill had passed both houses of Congress and been sent to the president, who signed it on July 30 as Public Law 689. This created the women's branch of the Navy reserve, as amended under Title V of the U.S. Naval Reserve Act of 1938. Less than a year later, on July 1, 1943, Congress refashioned the WAAC into the Women's Army Corps (WAC), which provided its members with similar military status as the WAVES.

The law was enacted to free up officers and men for duty at sea and to replace them with WAVES at shore stations on the home front. Women could now serve in the Navy as an officer or at an enlisted level, with a rank or rate consistent with that of the regular Navy. Volunteers could only serve for the duration of the war plus six months, and only in the continental United States. They were prohibited from boarding naval ships or combat aircraft, and were without command authority, except within the women's branch.

McAfee became the first director of the WAVES. She was commissioned a lieutenant commander on August 3, 1942 and was the first woman officer in the U.S. Naval Reserve. She was later promoted to the rank of captain. In More Than a Uniform, Winifred Quick Collins (a former WAVE officer) described Director McAfee as a born diplomat, handling difficult matters with finesse. She added that McAfee played an important role in the development of policies such as how the women would be treated compared to the men with respect to assignments they would take, as well as their housing conditions, supervision, and discipline standards.

In establishing the office of the director, the Bureau of Personnel did not define the responsibilities of the office, nor establish clear lines of authority. The bureau told McAfee "that she was to 'run' the women's reserve, and she was to go directly to the Chief of Naval Personnel for answers to her questions", but the decision was not made known to the operating divisions of the bureau." No planning had been done in anticipation of the Women's Reserve Act. For guidance, McAfee turned to Joy Bright Hancock, a Navy Yeoman (F) during World War I, and a career writer and editor for the Navy's Bureau of Aeronautics. Hancock was asked to examine the procedures employed by the Women's Division of the Royal Canadian Air Force, which had a complement of 6,000 members. Many of her findings were later used by the WAVES.

By September 1942, another 108 women were commissioned as officers in the WAVES, selected for their educational and business backgrounds. They were drawn to the program by the Advisory Council and McAfee's reputation. Four of these women would later become the directors of the WAVES and the director of the SPARS (U.S. Coast Guard Women's Reserve). The new officers began their work routine with no grasp of Navy traditions, or training in the service's operating methods, which resulted in some difficulties. On September 16, the Bureau of Personnel issued a memorandum for the organization of the Women's Reserve, specifying that the director would administer the program, set policies, and coordinate work within the bureau's operating divisions. Soon, McAfee was able to bring together a capable staff, building a sound internal organization.

== Recruiting ==
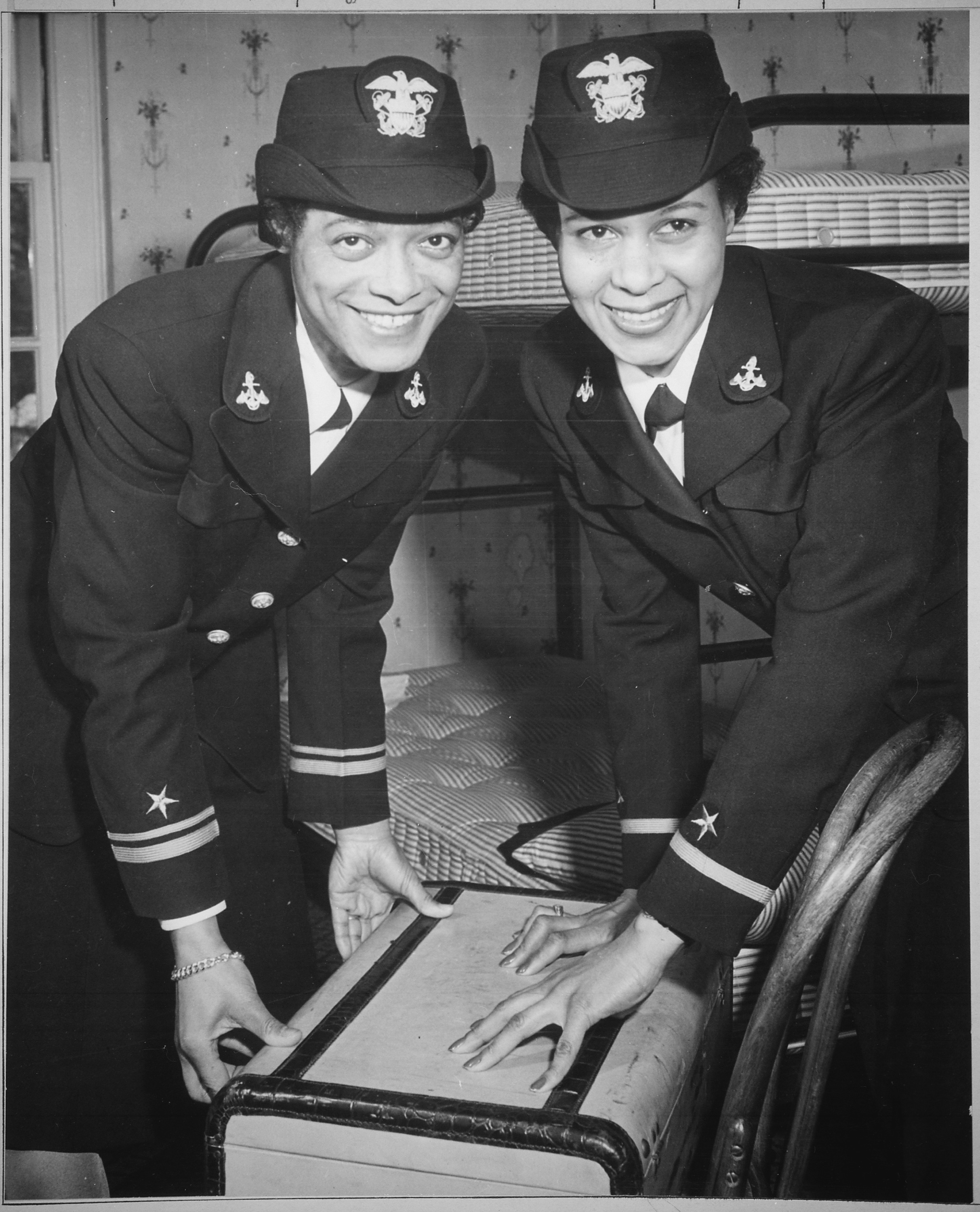
Lieutenant Harriet Ida Pickens and Ensign Frances Wills, the first African-American women to be commissioned into the WAVES

The WAVES officers were first assigned to recruiting stations in U.S. naval districts; later they were joined by enlisted personnel with recruiter training. The primary sources of publicity used were radio, newspapers, posters, brochures, and personal contacts. The focus of their advertising campaign was patriotism and the need for women to free up men for overseas duty. McAfee demanded good taste in all advertising, determined to cast the WAVES in a ladylike fashion. She said, "Advertising must appeal to conservative parents, schools, and churches as well as to the young women themselves." At the end of 1942, there were 770 officers and 3,109 enlisted women in the WAVES. By July 3, 1945, their ranks had risen to 86,291, which included 8,475 officers, 73,816 enlisted, and about 4,000 in training.

The age requirement for officer candidates was 20 to 49. They had to possess a college degree, or have two years of college and two years of equivalent professional or business experience. The age requirement for enlisted personnel was 20 to 35. They had to possess a high school or a business diploma, or have equivalent experience. U.S. citizenship was required in all cases. The WAVES were primarily white (and middle class) and they represented every state in the country. The greatest numbers of WAVES came from New York, California, Pennsylvania, Illinois, Massachusetts, and Ohio.

The legislation that established the WAVES was silent with respect to race, but Knox said that black WAVES would be enlisted "over his dead body". After Knox's death in April 1944, his successor Forrestal moved to reform the Navy's racial policies, and on July 28 he submitted to the president a proposal to accept WAVES on an integrated basis. Aware that 1944 was an election year, Forrestal tried to compromise by offering segregated living quarters and mess facilities, but Roosevelt decided to hold it up until after the election on November 7. The Republican candidate, Thomas E. Dewey, criticized the administration for discriminating against African-American women during a speech in Chicago. On October 19, 1944, Roosevelt instructed the Navy to accept African-American women into the WAVES.

The first African-American WAVES officers were Lieutenant Harriet Ida Pickens and Ensign Frances Wills, who were commissioned on December 21, 1944. The recruitment of African-American women began the following week. The plan for segregated quarters was impractical, because each recruit company contained 250 women and there were insufficient recruits to form an entire African-American company. McAfee appealed to Forrestal and he dropped the segregation requirement. By July 1945, some 72 African-American WAVES had undergone recruit training. While training was integrated, African-American WAVES experienced some restrictions, such as specialty assignments and living accommodations, which were segregated on some bases. Those who stayed in the WAVES after the war were employed without discrimination, but only five remained by August 1946.

== Uniforms ==
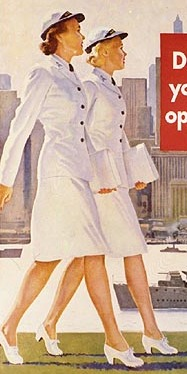
World War II recruiting poster showcasing a summer WAVES uniform

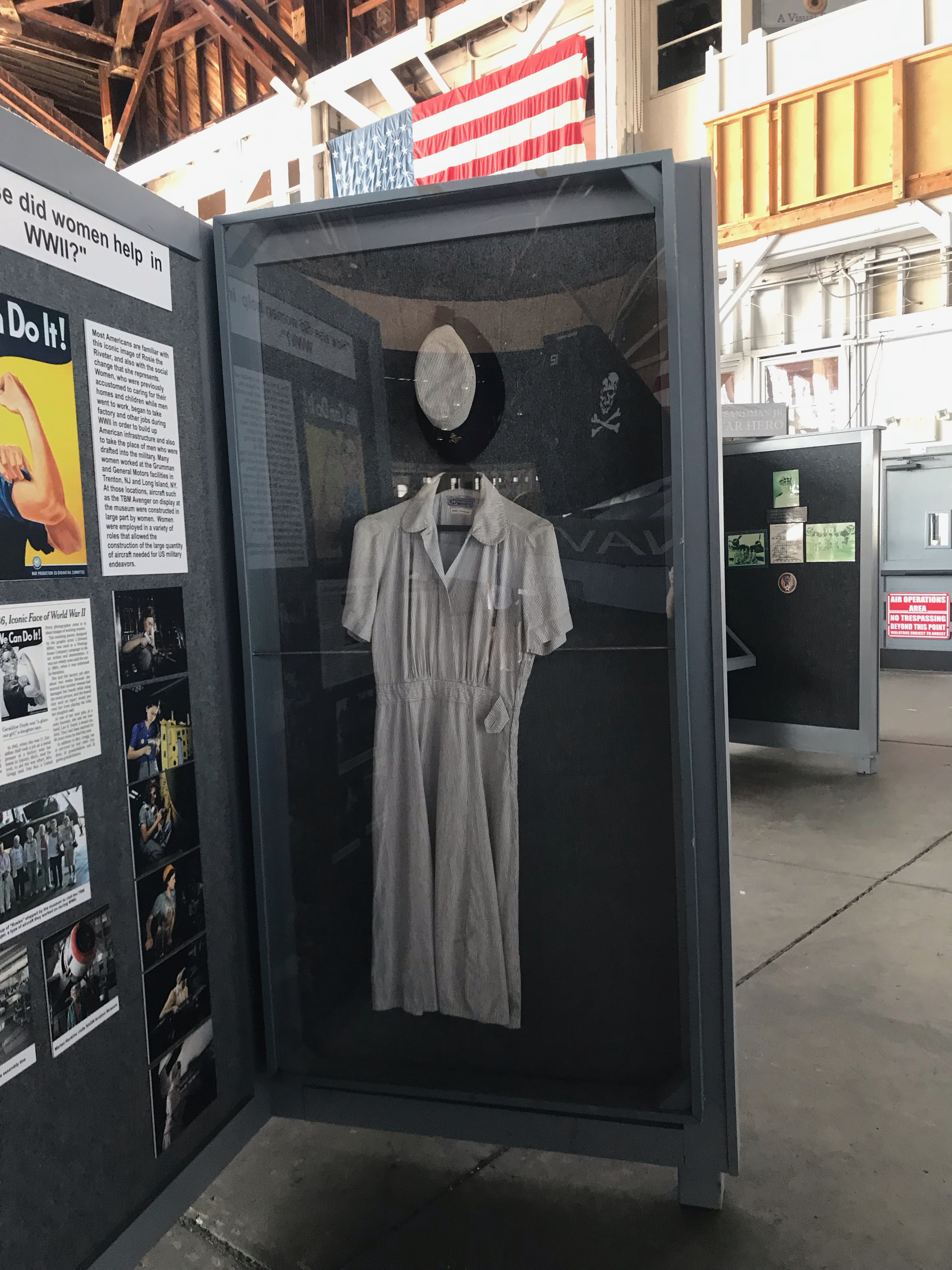
A gray-and-white-striped summer WAVES uniform. Photographed in 2024 at the Naval Air Station Wildwood Aviation Museum.

The WAVES' uniforms were designed by the New York fashion house of Mainbocher; their services were secured (without cost) through the efforts of Josephine Forrestal, a former fashion editor at Vogue and the wife of the Assistant Secretary of the Navy. The winter uniform was made from navy blue wool, worn with a white shirt and dark blue tie. The jacket was single-breasted and unbelted, with a six-gored skirt. Included were black Oxford shoes and cap and plain black pumps, a brimmed hat, black gloves, black leather purse, and rain and winter coats. The summer uniform was similar to the winter uniform but lighter in weight, made of white material, and worn with white shoes. Later, a gray-and-white-striped seersucker work uniform for summer was added, and slacks and dungarees could be worn when appropriate.

== Training ==
=== Officers ===
The Navy chose Smith College at Northampton, Massachusetts as the training site for WAVE officers. The facility offered much of what the Navy needed, and a college setting provided an appropriate training environment. Smith was nicknamed USS Northampton, although the official name of the training station was the United States Naval Reserve Midshipmen's School. Captain Herbert W. Underwood was recalled to active duty on August 13, 1942, and appointed commanding officer of the School. Underwood had a distinguished naval career and received the Navy Cross during World War I. In Lady in the Navy, Joy Bright Hancock described Underwood as intelligent, enthusiastic, and good humored, and serious of purpose.

Underwood and his staff quickly developed the curriculum that would hasten the transformation of civilian women into naval officers. The curriculum included: organization; personnel; naval history and law; ships and aircraft; naval communications and correspondence. A manual specifically for WAVES and their Coast Guard counterparts written by Lieutenant Commander Mary Virginia Harris detailed the military etiquette and naval knowledge that recruits were required to know. There would be two months of intensive training. This was too short a period to produce a fully trained naval officer, but the objective was to prepare the candidates with a basic understanding of the naval environment, while stressing administrative policy. It was the type of work that most officers would eventually be doing. The curriculum did not change much over the life of the training program.

Following their training, the midshipmen were commissioned as ensigns in the women's branch of the U.S. Naval Reserve and in the Women's branch of the U.S. Coast Guard Reserve (SPARS), or as second lieutenants in the United States Marine Corps Women's Reserve. The midshipmen included 203 SPARS and 295 women of the Marine Corps Women's Reserve. (Note: Initially, the U.S. Navy provided the training of officer candidates for the WAVES, SPARS, and Marine Corps Women's Reserve, but then in June and July 1943, the Coast Guard and the Marine Corps decided to operate their own training schools.) The school closed in December 1944, after accepting 10,181 women and graduating 9,477 of them. Many of these commissioned officers were sent to specialized schools for training in communications, supply, the Japanese language, meteorology, and engineering. The courses of study were held on the college campuses of Mount Holyoke College; Harvard University; the University of Colorado; the Massachusetts Institute of Technology; the University of California; and the University of Chicago. The Bureau of Ordnance also opened its schools to WAVE officers, where some of them studied aviation ordnance. Other officers attended the Naval Air Technical Training Command Schools in Corpus Christi, Texas, and Hollywood, Florida, to train as air navigation instructions. Unlike the training on the college campuses, the training offered at these facilities was coeducational.

=== Enlisted personnel ===
The Navy selected the campuses of Oklahoma A&M College, Indiana University, and the University of Wisconsin for both recruit and specialized training of enlisted WAVES. The training for the initial groups of enlisted women began on October 9, 1942. It soon became clear that these arrangements were unsuitable for recruit training, because of dispersed training facilities, inexperienced instructors, and the lack of esprit de corps. As a result, the Navy decided to establish one recruit training center on the campus of the Iowa State Teachers College.

Captain Randall Davis was named commanding officer of the center. He arrived on December 1, 1942, two weeks before the first class of 1,050 enlisted recruits were to start their five weeks of basic training. The training routine began weekday mornings with classes and drill, and repeated in the afternoon. Free time in the evening, followed by study or instruction until Taps. Saturday morning was the Captain's Inspection, with free time the rest of the day. On Sunday, church services and free time until evening, then study hours until Taps. (Note: This is a detailed look of how a recruit's day was filled. Each weekday, Reveille was at 5:30 or 6:00 am; breakfast at 6:30 am; classes and drill for four hours before lunch, and classes and drill for another four hours in the afternoon. This was followed by an hour of free time, dinner, and two hours of study or instruction, lights out at 10:00 pm. The Captain's Inspection was on Saturday morning, then free time until Taps. On Sunday, Reveille was at 7:00 am, with breakfast at 7:30 am. Trainees then attended church services, followed by free time until 7:30 pm, then study hours until Taps.) On December 30, 1942, the Navy announced that recruits in training and all future recruits would be trained at Hunter College in the Bronx, New York City. Hunter College was chosen because of its space, location, ease of transportation, and the willingness of the college to make its facilities available. Captain William F. Amsden, also a recipient of the Navy Cross in World War I, was named the commanding officer. On February 8, 1943, the college was commissioned the U.S. Naval Training Center, the Bronx, and became known as USS Hunter. Nine days later, approximately 2,000 recruits began their six weeks of training. The boot camp training objectives for the women were intended to be similar to those of the men. The range of instruction included: Navy ranks and rate; ships and aircraft of the fleet; naval traditions and customs; naval history; and emphasis on physical fitness. Between February 17, 1943 and October 10, 1945, some 80,936 WAVES, 1,844 SPARS, and 3,190 women Marines completed the training course. The SPARS and Marine reservists used the Navy's training center until the summer of 1943, at which time they established their own training centers.

Of the graduating classes at Hunter, 83% went on to specialized schools to train as yeomen, radio operators, storekeepers, and cooks and bakers. The enlisted WAVES trained at Georgia State College for Women in Milledgeville, Burdett College in Boston, and Miami University in Oxford, Ohio. The Bureaus of Aeronautics and Medicine opened their doors to the enlisted WAVES. The training in aeronautics took place at naval air stations and training centers; the training for medical technicians was held at the National Medical and Great Lakes Training Centers. These facilities were also coeducational.

== Assignments ==
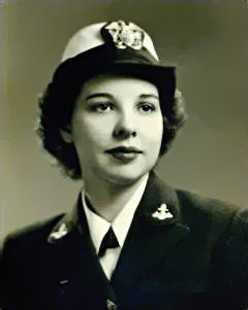
Ensign Winnie Breegle served in the WAVES as a cryptographer.

The WAVES served in 900 shore stations in the continental United States. Initially, they were prohibited from serving on ships or outside of the country. In September 1944, the Congress amended the law by allowing the WAVES to volunteer for service in the territories of Alaska and Hawaii. Hawaii was the only overseas station staffed with the WAVES on a permanent basis. The officers were employed in such professions as doctors, attorneys, engineers, mathematicians, and chaplains. One WAVE mathematician, Grace Hopper, was assigned to Harvard University to work on the computation project with the Mark I computer. Elsa Gardner became the only female nautical engineer in the entire U.S. Navy. Most enlisted WAVES worked in jobs traditionally performed by women, such as clerical work, health care, or storekeeping. A few took over jobs typically held by men, in occupations like aviation machinists, aviation metalsmiths, parachute riggers, control tower operators, radio operators, yeomen, or statisticians.

The WAVES practiced their professions and applied their skills at many naval bureaus and stations in the United States. The Washington, D.C., area had the largest complement of WAVES; some 20,000 women made up 55 percent of the Navy's personnel. The WAVES were responsible for 75 percent of the encoding and decoding of messages in the Office of Naval Operations. In the Bureau of Naval Personnel, the women made up 70 percent of the staff. In Postal Affairs, they handled 80 percent of the Navy's mail service. About 13,000 WAVES served in the Navy Hospital Corps, working in naval hospitals, stations, and dispensaries. The Bureau of Aeronautics utilized 23,000 women in Washington, D.C., and around the country. The Navy used 100 WAVES as weather forecasters at naval air stations. The Bureau of Aeronautics trained and assigned them to work in gunnery instruction, navigation, and traffic control. The Bureau of Ordnance used them primarily as mathematicians and technicians. Other bureaus utilized the WAVES on a much smaller scale. By the end of the war, 18% of the naval personnel assigned to shore stations were WAVES.

The mission of the WAVES was to replace the men in shore stations for sea duty, which led to some hostility from those who did not wish to be released. Sometimes the hostility was tacit, other times it was out in the open. In Crossed Currents, Ebbert and Hall recount a situation where a male officer upon greeting the WAVES officer about to work for him, told her that she was not wanted. When she asked him where her group was to be quartered, he told her that it was her problem. It was not always hostile behavior that was experienced; sometimes the women were assigned roles to which they were not physically suited. Ebbert and Hall provide an example where "...two husky enlisted men reasoned that if the women sent to replace them could not do the job, then the men could keep those jobs and avoid being sent to sea. They told the women, 'get those truck tires stowed properly in the loft, and then went off to lunch, sure the women could barely lift the tires. But they returned to find the tires stowed properly. The women had rigged a pulley." In other cases, due to the contradictory attitudes of their male superiors, the women were underutilized in relation to their training, and often were only tasked out of dire need. Conversely, once the commanding officers found that they had women who proved they could properly replace the men who were not available, their prejudices were often set aside.

== Personnel ==
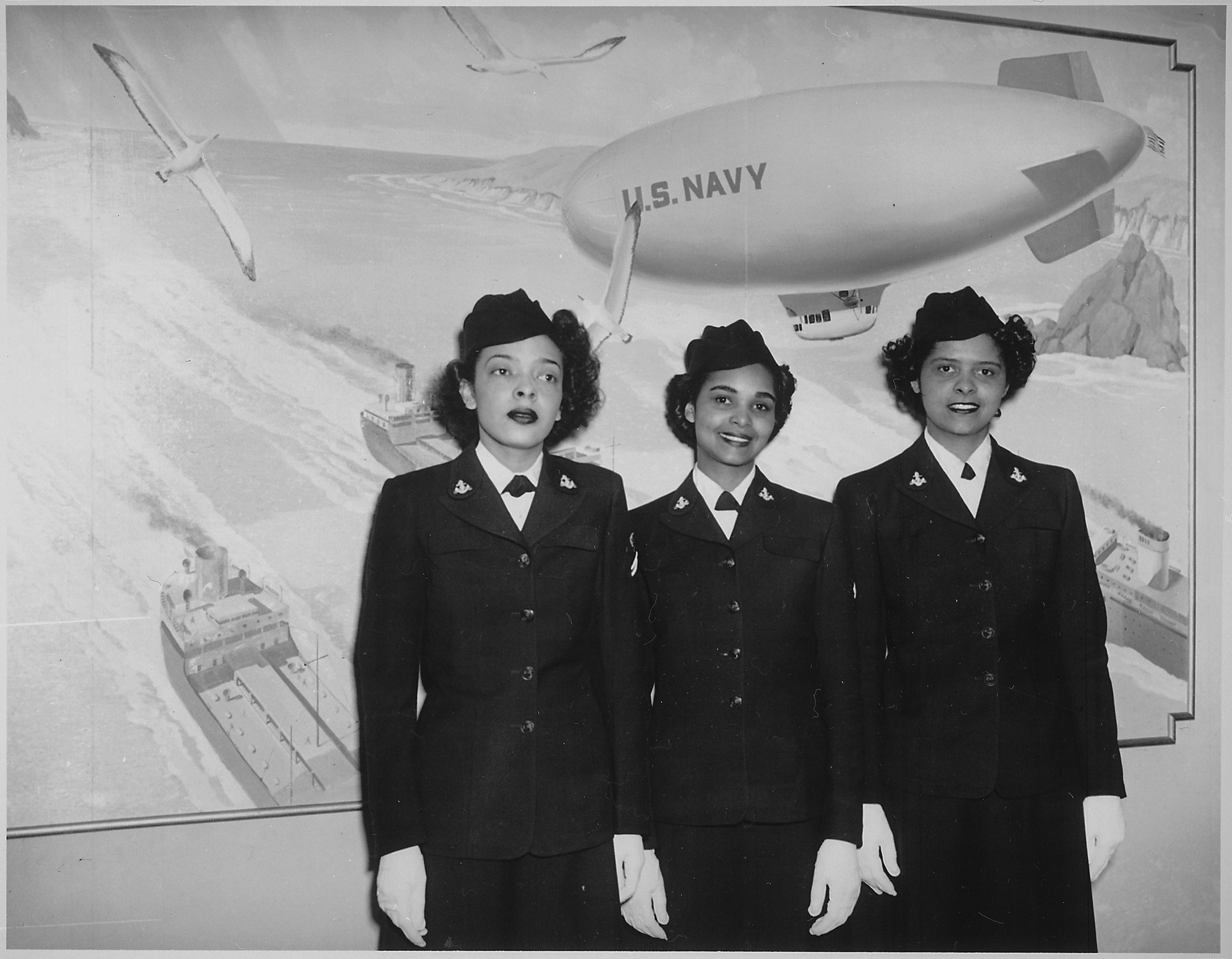
Ruth C. Isaacs, Katherine Horton, and Inez Patterson were the first African-American enlisted WAVES to enter the Hospital Corps School.

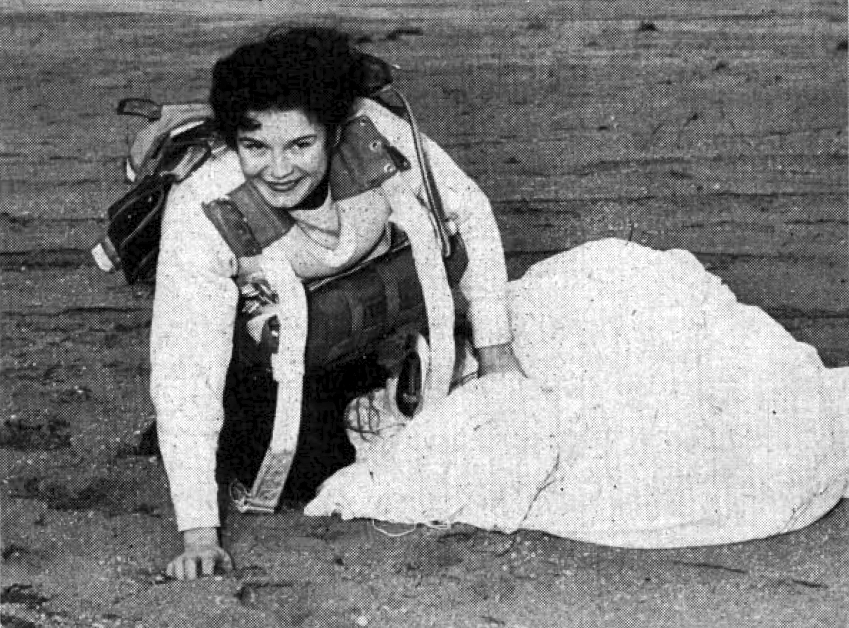
Mary L. Redfern was the first member of the WAVES to complete the parachute riggers course by making a jump.

Many young women joined the WAVES out of patriotism or family tradition. Others were motivated by adventure, professional development, or the experience of life in the military or on college campuses.

It was a choice of adventure. I didn't have any brothers, and I thought that's something I can do, one way I can make a contribution. My sisters thought it was great, but they were not interested. There was too much discipline and routine involved. I felt like it would be a challenge, to step forth and do it, to see what it was all about. It gave a sense of confidence. At the time girls just didn't join the WAVES or go into the military. But my Dad, he said, you'll be OK.

— Ruby Messer Barber

I was fascinated by the ships which are making history in every battle. I've talked to seamen and I've met flyers – from [Iwo Jima], from Okinawa, heroes from every encounter. I know now what war means and my heart goes out to every one of them. Among them I am making, I hope, life long friends, for their experiences mean everything to my self-satisfaction ... As long as they fight on, I have no desire to return home, for I feel I belong here ... I have learned much in these brief three months about life and living. And I know I have already changed in many ways and many viewpoints ... It is truly a most broadening experience and I shall never outlive it.

— Lieutenant Lillian Pimlott in a letter to her mother from Pearl Harbor

Seven WAVE officers and 62 enlisted women died during the war. Many WAVES were acknowledged for their contributions to the country. The Distinguished Service Medal was awarded to Captain McAfee for her efforts as Director of the WAVES, and Commander Reynard received a letter of commendation from the Secretary of the Navy for her work in developing the WAVES training program. Two of the WAVES received the Legion of Merit, three the Bronze Star, eighteen the Secretary of the Navy's letter of commendation, and one, the Army Commendation Medal. Almost all of the WAVES looked upon their service as beneficial and many said they would serve again under the same situation.

== Demobilization ==
At the end of the war, the Navy established five separation centers for the demobilization of the WAVES and for the Navy nurses. These were located in Washington, D.C., Memphis, San Francisco, Chicago, and New York. The separation process began on October 1, 1945, and within a month about 9,000 of the WAVES had been separated. By the end of 1946, almost 21,000 more had been discharged. It soon became apparent that more centers were needed, and ten more were opened. By September 1946, the demobilization of the WAVES was all but complete. Most women spent two or three days at the separation centers before being discharged to get physical exams, orientation on rights as veterans, final settlement of pay, and then the price of a ticket home. At the time, it was not clear whether the demobilization meant phasing the women out of the military services altogether.

Although a small contingent of WAVES was retained to help with the Navy's over-all demobilization plan, many of these women had volunteered to remain on active duty. At that point, Vice Admiral Louis Denfeld, chief of the Bureau of Personnel, announced, "Our plan is to keep a WAVE component in the Naval Reserve. Further, if Congress approves, we will seek to retain on active duty a reasonable number of WAVES who wish to do so and who may be needed in certain specialties ..." On July 30, 1948, the Women's Armed Services Integration Act (Public Law 625) was signed into law by President Harry S. Truman, allowing the women to serve in the regular Army or Navy on a permanent basis. The wartime prohibition of women serving in any unit having a combat mission was carried over into the 1948 Act. While the legislation was an extraordinary advancement for women, it effectively kept them from being integrated into the mainstream of the military for more than a quarter of a century. Despite this roadblock, some continued serving in the Navy, finding alternate paths such as participating in training programs for Inactive Volunteer Reservists, joining Volunteer Composite Units, or attaching to various Mobilization Drill Teams. WAVES no longer existed, yet the obsolete acronym continued in popular and official usage until the 1970s.

With the demobilization, the WAVES received accolades from senior personnel. Secretary of the Navy Forrestal wrote, "Your conduct, discharge of military responsibilities, and skillful work are in the highest tradition of the naval service." Fleet Admiral King said, "The Navy has learned to appreciate the women ... for their discipline, their skill, and their contribution to high morale ... Our greatest tribute to these women is the request for more WAVES". Fleet Admiral Nimitz added that "they have demonstrated qualities of competence, energy and loyalty". Ebbert and Hall contend that the WAVES' accomplishments helped to secure a place for the women in the regular Navy.

== Song ==
Elizabeth Ender and Betty St. Clair wrote "WAVES of the Navy" in 1943. It was written to harmonize with "Anchors Aweigh".

WAVES of the Navy

WAVES of the Navy,
There's a ship sailing down the bay
And she won't slip into port again
Until that Victory Day.

Carry on for that gallant ship
And for every hero brave
Who will find ashore, his man-sized chore
Was done by a Navy WAVE.

== Notable people ==
- Maria Emiliana Aquino
- Gertrude Joy Grimm
- Violetta Maloney Halpert
- Mary Josephine Shelly
- Jeanne Rowe Skinner

== See also ==
- United States Coast Guard (USCG) Women's Reserve (SPARS)
- Women Airforce Service Pilots (WASP)
- Women's Army Corps (WACs)
- Women's Auxiliary Air Force (British)
- Women's Royal Canadian Naval Service
- Women's Royal Naval Service (British) "Wrens"
- Women's Royal Australian Naval Service
